

607001–607100 

|-bgcolor=#E9E9E9
| 607001 ||  || — || October 8, 2007 || Mount Lemmon || Mount Lemmon Survey ||  || align=right data-sort-value="0.67" | 670 m || 
|-id=002 bgcolor=#fefefe
| 607002 ||  || — || December 18, 2004 || Mount Lemmon || Mount Lemmon Survey ||  || align=right data-sort-value="0.49" | 490 m || 
|-id=003 bgcolor=#d6d6d6
| 607003 ||  || — || August 7, 2018 || Haleakala || Pan-STARRS ||  || align=right | 2.1 km || 
|-id=004 bgcolor=#d6d6d6
| 607004 ||  || — || January 15, 2015 || Haleakala || Pan-STARRS ||  || align=right | 2.2 km || 
|-id=005 bgcolor=#d6d6d6
| 607005 ||  || — || January 15, 2015 || Mount Lemmon || Mount Lemmon Survey ||  || align=right | 2.1 km || 
|-id=006 bgcolor=#fefefe
| 607006 ||  || — || January 25, 2007 || Kitt Peak || Spacewatch ||  || align=right data-sort-value="0.54" | 540 m || 
|-id=007 bgcolor=#E9E9E9
| 607007 ||  || — || December 29, 2011 || Mount Lemmon || Mount Lemmon Survey ||  || align=right data-sort-value="0.87" | 870 m || 
|-id=008 bgcolor=#d6d6d6
| 607008 ||  || — || October 8, 2008 || Mount Lemmon || Mount Lemmon Survey ||  || align=right | 2.1 km || 
|-id=009 bgcolor=#d6d6d6
| 607009 ||  || — || August 30, 2005 || Kitt Peak || Spacewatch ||  || align=right | 2.2 km || 
|-id=010 bgcolor=#d6d6d6
| 607010 ||  || — || May 2, 2014 || Mount Lemmon || Mount Lemmon Survey ||  || align=right | 2.8 km || 
|-id=011 bgcolor=#d6d6d6
| 607011 ||  || — || March 31, 2008 || Mount Lemmon || Mount Lemmon Survey ||  || align=right | 2.0 km || 
|-id=012 bgcolor=#E9E9E9
| 607012 ||  || — || September 25, 2012 || Mount Lemmon || Mount Lemmon Survey ||  || align=right | 1.1 km || 
|-id=013 bgcolor=#d6d6d6
| 607013 ||  || — || January 22, 1993 || Kitt Peak || Spacewatch ||  || align=right | 2.0 km || 
|-id=014 bgcolor=#d6d6d6
| 607014 ||  || — || October 17, 2006 || Mount Lemmon || Mount Lemmon Survey || 7:4 || align=right | 3.6 km || 
|-id=015 bgcolor=#fefefe
| 607015 ||  || — || January 19, 1994 || Kitt Peak || Spacewatch ||  || align=right data-sort-value="0.66" | 660 m || 
|-id=016 bgcolor=#fefefe
| 607016 ||  || — || April 6, 1994 || Kitt Peak || Spacewatch ||  || align=right data-sort-value="0.78" | 780 m || 
|-id=017 bgcolor=#d6d6d6
| 607017 ||  || — || September 5, 1994 || Kitt Peak || Spacewatch ||  || align=right | 2.3 km || 
|-id=018 bgcolor=#d6d6d6
| 607018 ||  || — || September 28, 1994 || Kitt Peak || Spacewatch ||  || align=right | 1.9 km || 
|-id=019 bgcolor=#d6d6d6
| 607019 ||  || — || October 26, 1994 || Kitt Peak || Spacewatch ||  || align=right | 2.5 km || 
|-id=020 bgcolor=#E9E9E9
| 607020 ||  || — || October 28, 1994 || Kitt Peak || Spacewatch ||  || align=right data-sort-value="0.60" | 600 m || 
|-id=021 bgcolor=#E9E9E9
| 607021 ||  || — || November 28, 1994 || Kitt Peak || Spacewatch ||  || align=right | 1.5 km || 
|-id=022 bgcolor=#E9E9E9
| 607022 ||  || — || December 1, 1994 || Kitt Peak || Spacewatch ||  || align=right | 2.3 km || 
|-id=023 bgcolor=#fefefe
| 607023 ||  || — || February 1, 1995 || Kitt Peak || Spacewatch ||  || align=right data-sort-value="0.86" | 860 m || 
|-id=024 bgcolor=#E9E9E9
| 607024 ||  || — || March 1, 1995 || Kitt Peak || Spacewatch ||  || align=right | 2.2 km || 
|-id=025 bgcolor=#fefefe
| 607025 ||  || — || March 26, 1995 || Kitt Peak || Spacewatch ||  || align=right data-sort-value="0.64" | 640 m || 
|-id=026 bgcolor=#E9E9E9
| 607026 ||  || — || June 29, 1995 || Kitt Peak || Spacewatch ||  || align=right | 1.1 km || 
|-id=027 bgcolor=#d6d6d6
| 607027 ||  || — || July 22, 1995 || Kitt Peak || Spacewatch ||  || align=right | 1.8 km || 
|-id=028 bgcolor=#E9E9E9
| 607028 ||  || — || September 5, 2008 || Kitt Peak || Spacewatch ||  || align=right | 1.4 km || 
|-id=029 bgcolor=#d6d6d6
| 607029 ||  || — || September 23, 1995 || Kitt Peak || Spacewatch ||  || align=right | 2.5 km || 
|-id=030 bgcolor=#d6d6d6
| 607030 ||  || — || September 19, 1995 || Kitt Peak || Spacewatch ||  || align=right | 2.8 km || 
|-id=031 bgcolor=#d6d6d6
| 607031 ||  || — || September 30, 1995 || Kitt Peak || Spacewatch ||  || align=right | 2.0 km || 
|-id=032 bgcolor=#E9E9E9
| 607032 ||  || — || September 24, 1995 || Kitt Peak || Spacewatch ||  || align=right | 1.1 km || 
|-id=033 bgcolor=#fefefe
| 607033 ||  || — || September 17, 1995 || Kitt Peak || Spacewatch ||  || align=right data-sort-value="0.71" | 710 m || 
|-id=034 bgcolor=#fefefe
| 607034 ||  || — || October 21, 1995 || Kitt Peak || Spacewatch ||  || align=right data-sort-value="0.63" | 630 m || 
|-id=035 bgcolor=#E9E9E9
| 607035 ||  || — || October 24, 1995 || Kitt Peak || Spacewatch ||  || align=right | 1.0 km || 
|-id=036 bgcolor=#d6d6d6
| 607036 ||  || — || October 24, 1995 || Kitt Peak || Spacewatch ||  || align=right | 2.0 km || 
|-id=037 bgcolor=#E9E9E9
| 607037 ||  || — || October 17, 1995 || Kitt Peak || Spacewatch ||  || align=right | 1.2 km || 
|-id=038 bgcolor=#E9E9E9
| 607038 ||  || — || October 21, 1995 || Kitt Peak || Spacewatch ||  || align=right | 1.0 km || 
|-id=039 bgcolor=#E9E9E9
| 607039 ||  || — || October 21, 1995 || Kitt Peak || Spacewatch ||  || align=right | 1.0 km || 
|-id=040 bgcolor=#d6d6d6
| 607040 ||  || — || October 24, 1995 || Kitt Peak || Spacewatch ||  || align=right | 2.0 km || 
|-id=041 bgcolor=#fefefe
| 607041 ||  || — || October 24, 1995 || Kitt Peak || Spacewatch ||  || align=right data-sort-value="0.54" | 540 m || 
|-id=042 bgcolor=#d6d6d6
| 607042 ||  || — || November 20, 1995 || Kitt Peak || Spacewatch ||  || align=right | 1.7 km || 
|-id=043 bgcolor=#d6d6d6
| 607043 ||  || — || January 13, 1996 || Kitt Peak || Spacewatch ||  || align=right | 2.1 km || 
|-id=044 bgcolor=#E9E9E9
| 607044 ||  || — || January 21, 1996 || Kitt Peak || Spacewatch ||  || align=right | 1.5 km || 
|-id=045 bgcolor=#E9E9E9
| 607045 ||  || — || January 15, 1996 || Kitt Peak || Spacewatch ||  || align=right data-sort-value="0.99" | 990 m || 
|-id=046 bgcolor=#d6d6d6
| 607046 ||  || — || January 21, 1996 || Kitt Peak || Spacewatch ||  || align=right | 2.8 km || 
|-id=047 bgcolor=#E9E9E9
| 607047 ||  || — || March 11, 1996 || Kitt Peak || Spacewatch ||  || align=right | 1.4 km || 
|-id=048 bgcolor=#d6d6d6
| 607048 ||  || — || February 17, 2013 || Kitt Peak || Spacewatch ||  || align=right | 2.8 km || 
|-id=049 bgcolor=#E9E9E9
| 607049 ||  || — || April 12, 1996 || Kitt Peak || Spacewatch ||  || align=right | 1.7 km || 
|-id=050 bgcolor=#E9E9E9
| 607050 ||  || — || September 15, 1996 || Kitt Peak || Spacewatch ||  || align=right data-sort-value="0.85" | 850 m || 
|-id=051 bgcolor=#E9E9E9
| 607051 ||  || — || November 8, 1996 || Kitt Peak || Spacewatch ||  || align=right data-sort-value="0.73" | 730 m || 
|-id=052 bgcolor=#d6d6d6
| 607052 ||  || — || December 1, 1996 || Kitt Peak || Spacewatch ||  || align=right | 2.6 km || 
|-id=053 bgcolor=#fefefe
| 607053 ||  || — || December 4, 1996 || Kitt Peak || Spacewatch ||  || align=right data-sort-value="0.69" | 690 m || 
|-id=054 bgcolor=#E9E9E9
| 607054 ||  || — || January 3, 2014 || Kitt Peak || Spacewatch ||  || align=right data-sort-value="0.84" | 840 m || 
|-id=055 bgcolor=#E9E9E9
| 607055 ||  || — || January 31, 1997 || Kitt Peak || Spacewatch ||  || align=right | 1.3 km || 
|-id=056 bgcolor=#E9E9E9
| 607056 ||  || — || February 3, 1997 || Kitt Peak || Spacewatch ||  || align=right data-sort-value="0.69" | 690 m || 
|-id=057 bgcolor=#fefefe
| 607057 ||  || — || March 7, 1997 || Kitt Peak || Spacewatch || H || align=right data-sort-value="0.62" | 620 m || 
|-id=058 bgcolor=#E9E9E9
| 607058 ||  || — || March 4, 1997 || Kitt Peak || Spacewatch ||  || align=right | 1.1 km || 
|-id=059 bgcolor=#E9E9E9
| 607059 ||  || — || March 4, 1997 || Kitt Peak || Spacewatch ||  || align=right data-sort-value="0.97" | 970 m || 
|-id=060 bgcolor=#E9E9E9
| 607060 ||  || — || March 5, 1997 || Kitt Peak || Spacewatch ||  || align=right data-sort-value="0.95" | 950 m || 
|-id=061 bgcolor=#E9E9E9
| 607061 ||  || — || July 2, 1997 || Kitt Peak || Spacewatch ||  || align=right | 2.7 km || 
|-id=062 bgcolor=#d6d6d6
| 607062 ||  || — || January 26, 2011 || Mount Lemmon || Mount Lemmon Survey ||  || align=right | 2.3 km || 
|-id=063 bgcolor=#E9E9E9
| 607063 ||  || — || September 23, 1997 || Kitt Peak || Spacewatch ||  || align=right | 2.0 km || 
|-id=064 bgcolor=#d6d6d6
| 607064 ||  || — || September 28, 1997 || Kitt Peak || Spacewatch ||  || align=right | 2.3 km || 
|-id=065 bgcolor=#E9E9E9
| 607065 ||  || — || September 29, 1997 || Kitt Peak || Spacewatch ||  || align=right | 1.6 km || 
|-id=066 bgcolor=#E9E9E9
| 607066 ||  || — || September 29, 1997 || Kitt Peak || Spacewatch ||  || align=right | 1.5 km || 
|-id=067 bgcolor=#d6d6d6
| 607067 ||  || — || September 30, 1997 || Kitt Peak || Spacewatch ||  || align=right | 2.8 km || 
|-id=068 bgcolor=#d6d6d6
| 607068 ||  || — || September 28, 1997 || Kitt Peak || Spacewatch ||  || align=right | 2.9 km || 
|-id=069 bgcolor=#d6d6d6
| 607069 ||  || — || March 28, 2001 || Kitt Peak || Spacewatch ||  || align=right | 4.1 km || 
|-id=070 bgcolor=#E9E9E9
| 607070 ||  || — || January 17, 2013 || Haleakala || Pan-STARRS ||  || align=right | 2.0 km || 
|-id=071 bgcolor=#fefefe
| 607071 ||  || — || October 1, 1997 || Mauna Kea || R. Shank, C. Veillet ||  || align=right data-sort-value="0.63" | 630 m || 
|-id=072 bgcolor=#fefefe
| 607072 ||  || — || October 3, 1997 || Kitt Peak || Spacewatch ||  || align=right data-sort-value="0.79" | 790 m || 
|-id=073 bgcolor=#fefefe
| 607073 ||  || — || October 2, 1997 || Mauna Kea || R. Shank, C. Veillet ||  || align=right data-sort-value="0.55" | 550 m || 
|-id=074 bgcolor=#d6d6d6
| 607074 ||  || — || October 2, 1997 || Kitt Peak || Spacewatch ||  || align=right | 3.1 km || 
|-id=075 bgcolor=#fefefe
| 607075 ||  || — || October 21, 1997 || Kitt Peak || Spacewatch ||  || align=right data-sort-value="0.78" | 780 m || 
|-id=076 bgcolor=#fefefe
| 607076 ||  || — || January 26, 1998 || Kitt Peak || Spacewatch ||  || align=right data-sort-value="0.70" | 700 m || 
|-id=077 bgcolor=#d6d6d6
| 607077 ||  || — || January 26, 1998 || Kitt Peak || Spacewatch ||  || align=right | 2.3 km || 
|-id=078 bgcolor=#fefefe
| 607078 ||  || — || January 29, 1998 || Kitt Peak || Spacewatch ||  || align=right data-sort-value="0.59" | 590 m || 
|-id=079 bgcolor=#fefefe
| 607079 ||  || — || February 21, 1998 || Kitt Peak || Spacewatch ||  || align=right data-sort-value="0.66" | 660 m || 
|-id=080 bgcolor=#E9E9E9
| 607080 ||  || — || March 13, 2010 || Pla D'Arguines || R. Ferrando, M. Ferrando ||  || align=right data-sort-value="0.92" | 920 m || 
|-id=081 bgcolor=#fefefe
| 607081 ||  || — || April 22, 2009 || Mount Lemmon || Mount Lemmon Survey ||  || align=right data-sort-value="0.50" | 500 m || 
|-id=082 bgcolor=#E9E9E9
| 607082 ||  || — || April 20, 1998 || Kitt Peak || Spacewatch ||  || align=right | 1.0 km || 
|-id=083 bgcolor=#E9E9E9
| 607083 ||  || — || April 19, 1998 || Kitt Peak || Spacewatch ||  || align=right | 1.2 km || 
|-id=084 bgcolor=#E9E9E9
| 607084 ||  || — || April 18, 1998 || Kitt Peak || Spacewatch ||  || align=right | 1.1 km || 
|-id=085 bgcolor=#E9E9E9
| 607085 ||  || — || May 16, 1998 || Kitt Peak || Spacewatch ||  || align=right data-sort-value="0.87" | 870 m || 
|-id=086 bgcolor=#E9E9E9
| 607086 ||  || — || July 18, 1998 || Bergisch Gladbach || W. Bickel ||  || align=right | 1.8 km || 
|-id=087 bgcolor=#E9E9E9
| 607087 ||  || — || April 8, 2006 || Kitt Peak || Spacewatch ||  || align=right | 1.4 km || 
|-id=088 bgcolor=#E9E9E9
| 607088 ||  || — || August 31, 1998 || Kitt Peak || Spacewatch ||  || align=right | 1.4 km || 
|-id=089 bgcolor=#fefefe
| 607089 ||  || — || September 29, 2011 || Piszkesteto || K. Sárneczky ||  || align=right data-sort-value="0.54" | 540 m || 
|-id=090 bgcolor=#E9E9E9
| 607090 ||  || — || September 14, 1998 || Kitt Peak || Spacewatch ||  || align=right | 1.7 km || 
|-id=091 bgcolor=#d6d6d6
| 607091 ||  || — || September 17, 1998 || Kitt Peak || Spacewatch ||  || align=right | 2.5 km || 
|-id=092 bgcolor=#d6d6d6
| 607092 ||  || — || September 23, 1998 || Kitt Peak || Spacewatch ||  || align=right | 2.3 km || 
|-id=093 bgcolor=#d6d6d6
| 607093 ||  || — || September 20, 1998 || Kitt Peak || Spacewatch || EOS || align=right | 1.7 km || 
|-id=094 bgcolor=#fefefe
| 607094 ||  || — || September 24, 1998 || Kitt Peak || Spacewatch ||  || align=right data-sort-value="0.46" | 460 m || 
|-id=095 bgcolor=#E9E9E9
| 607095 ||  || — || September 28, 1998 || Kitt Peak || Spacewatch ||  || align=right | 1.7 km || 
|-id=096 bgcolor=#fefefe
| 607096 ||  || — || May 15, 2005 || Mount Lemmon || Mount Lemmon Survey ||  || align=right data-sort-value="0.80" | 800 m || 
|-id=097 bgcolor=#FA8072
| 607097 ||  || — || July 18, 2001 || Kitt Peak || Spacewatch ||  || align=right data-sort-value="0.44" | 440 m || 
|-id=098 bgcolor=#E9E9E9
| 607098 ||  || — || July 27, 2011 || Haleakala || Pan-STARRS ||  || align=right | 1.9 km || 
|-id=099 bgcolor=#E9E9E9
| 607099 ||  || — || March 13, 2005 || Mount Lemmon || Mount Lemmon Survey ||  || align=right | 1.9 km || 
|-id=100 bgcolor=#d6d6d6
| 607100 ||  || — || July 31, 2014 || Haleakala || Pan-STARRS ||  || align=right | 3.0 km || 
|}

607101–607200 

|-bgcolor=#d6d6d6
| 607101 ||  || — || November 11, 2004 || Kitt Peak || Spacewatch ||  || align=right | 3.3 km || 
|-id=102 bgcolor=#d6d6d6
| 607102 ||  || — || October 16, 2009 || Mount Lemmon || Mount Lemmon Survey ||  || align=right | 2.1 km || 
|-id=103 bgcolor=#d6d6d6
| 607103 ||  || — || July 4, 2014 || Haleakala || Pan-STARRS ||  || align=right | 2.2 km || 
|-id=104 bgcolor=#E9E9E9
| 607104 ||  || — || October 21, 2016 || Mount Lemmon || Mount Lemmon Survey ||  || align=right | 1.8 km || 
|-id=105 bgcolor=#E9E9E9
| 607105 ||  || — || November 26, 2003 || Kitt Peak || Spacewatch ||  || align=right | 1.6 km || 
|-id=106 bgcolor=#fefefe
| 607106 ||  || — || June 11, 2004 || Kitt Peak || Spacewatch ||  || align=right data-sort-value="0.62" | 620 m || 
|-id=107 bgcolor=#fefefe
| 607107 ||  || — || October 20, 2008 || Kitt Peak || Spacewatch ||  || align=right data-sort-value="0.51" | 510 m || 
|-id=108 bgcolor=#fefefe
| 607108 ||  || — || May 14, 2005 || Mount Lemmon || Mount Lemmon Survey ||  || align=right data-sort-value="0.54" | 540 m || 
|-id=109 bgcolor=#E9E9E9
| 607109 ||  || — || September 19, 1998 || Apache Point || SDSS Collaboration ||  || align=right | 1.8 km || 
|-id=110 bgcolor=#E9E9E9
| 607110 ||  || — || September 23, 1998 || Kitt Peak || Spacewatch ||  || align=right | 1.3 km || 
|-id=111 bgcolor=#fefefe
| 607111 ||  || — || October 1, 1998 || Kitt Peak || Spacewatch ||  || align=right data-sort-value="0.73" | 730 m || 
|-id=112 bgcolor=#fefefe
| 607112 ||  || — || October 14, 1998 || Kitt Peak || Spacewatch ||  || align=right data-sort-value="0.46" | 460 m || 
|-id=113 bgcolor=#fefefe
| 607113 ||  || — || October 13, 1998 || Kitt Peak || Spacewatch ||  || align=right data-sort-value="0.59" | 590 m || 
|-id=114 bgcolor=#d6d6d6
| 607114 ||  || — || October 14, 1998 || Kitt Peak || Spacewatch ||  || align=right | 2.5 km || 
|-id=115 bgcolor=#fefefe
| 607115 ||  || — || October 14, 1998 || Kitt Peak || Spacewatch ||  || align=right data-sort-value="0.71" | 710 m || 
|-id=116 bgcolor=#d6d6d6
| 607116 ||  || — || November 14, 1998 || Kitt Peak || Spacewatch ||  || align=right | 2.2 km || 
|-id=117 bgcolor=#fefefe
| 607117 ||  || — || November 15, 1998 || Kitt Peak || Spacewatch ||  || align=right data-sort-value="0.69" | 690 m || 
|-id=118 bgcolor=#E9E9E9
| 607118 ||  || — || October 21, 2007 || Kitt Peak || Spacewatch ||  || align=right | 1.7 km || 
|-id=119 bgcolor=#E9E9E9
| 607119 ||  || — || January 13, 1999 || Mauna Kea || J. Anderson, C. Veillet ||  || align=right | 1.9 km || 
|-id=120 bgcolor=#E9E9E9
| 607120 ||  || — || January 12, 1999 || Mauna Kea || J. Anderson, C. Veillet ||  || align=right | 1.7 km || 
|-id=121 bgcolor=#fefefe
| 607121 ||  || — || March 10, 2007 || Kitt Peak || Spacewatch ||  || align=right data-sort-value="0.62" | 620 m || 
|-id=122 bgcolor=#fefefe
| 607122 ||  || — || January 25, 2003 || Kitt Peak || Spacewatch ||  || align=right data-sort-value="0.68" | 680 m || 
|-id=123 bgcolor=#E9E9E9
| 607123 ||  || — || February 7, 1999 || Kitt Peak || Spacewatch ||  || align=right | 1.7 km || 
|-id=124 bgcolor=#E9E9E9
| 607124 ||  || — || October 19, 2011 || Mount Lemmon || Mount Lemmon Survey ||  || align=right | 1.9 km || 
|-id=125 bgcolor=#fefefe
| 607125 ||  || — || December 29, 2008 || Mount Lemmon || Mount Lemmon Survey ||  || align=right data-sort-value="0.57" | 570 m || 
|-id=126 bgcolor=#fefefe
| 607126 ||  || — || March 10, 1999 || Kitt Peak || Spacewatch ||  || align=right data-sort-value="0.59" | 590 m || 
|-id=127 bgcolor=#fefefe
| 607127 ||  || — || December 18, 2007 || Mount Lemmon || Mount Lemmon Survey ||  || align=right data-sort-value="0.86" | 860 m || 
|-id=128 bgcolor=#fefefe
| 607128 ||  || — || November 30, 2000 || Kitt Peak || Spacewatch ||  || align=right data-sort-value="0.85" | 850 m || 
|-id=129 bgcolor=#E9E9E9
| 607129 ||  || — || August 16, 2012 || Siding Spring || SSS ||  || align=right | 1.2 km || 
|-id=130 bgcolor=#d6d6d6
| 607130 ||  || — || October 12, 2016 || Haleakala || Pan-STARRS ||  || align=right | 2.0 km || 
|-id=131 bgcolor=#fefefe
| 607131 ||  || — || September 10, 2007 || Mount Lemmon || Mount Lemmon Survey ||  || align=right data-sort-value="0.57" | 570 m || 
|-id=132 bgcolor=#d6d6d6
| 607132 ||  || — || March 20, 1999 || Apache Point || SDSS Collaboration ||  || align=right | 2.1 km || 
|-id=133 bgcolor=#d6d6d6
| 607133 ||  || — || January 11, 2015 || Haleakala || Pan-STARRS ||  || align=right | 2.2 km || 
|-id=134 bgcolor=#fefefe
| 607134 ||  || — || March 27, 2009 || Mount Lemmon || Mount Lemmon Survey ||  || align=right data-sort-value="0.63" | 630 m || 
|-id=135 bgcolor=#fefefe
| 607135 ||  || — || July 14, 1999 || Socorro || LINEAR ||  || align=right data-sort-value="0.80" | 800 m || 
|-id=136 bgcolor=#fefefe
| 607136 ||  || — || September 29, 2010 || Mount Lemmon || Mount Lemmon Survey ||  || align=right data-sort-value="0.66" | 660 m || 
|-id=137 bgcolor=#E9E9E9
| 607137 ||  || — || September 8, 1999 || Catalina || CSS ||  || align=right | 1.3 km || 
|-id=138 bgcolor=#E9E9E9
| 607138 ||  || — || August 10, 2007 || Kitt Peak || Spacewatch ||  || align=right | 1.6 km || 
|-id=139 bgcolor=#d6d6d6
| 607139 ||  || — || June 6, 1997 || Mauna Kea || C. Veillet ||  || align=right | 3.2 km || 
|-id=140 bgcolor=#fefefe
| 607140 ||  || — || September 21, 1999 || Eskridge || G. Bell, G. Hug ||  || align=right data-sort-value="0.57" | 570 m || 
|-id=141 bgcolor=#fefefe
| 607141 ||  || — || September 18, 1999 || Kitt Peak || Spacewatch ||  || align=right data-sort-value="0.74" | 740 m || 
|-id=142 bgcolor=#E9E9E9
| 607142 ||  || — || October 3, 1999 || Kitt Peak || Spacewatch ||  || align=right | 1.1 km || 
|-id=143 bgcolor=#d6d6d6
| 607143 ||  || — || October 3, 1999 || Kitt Peak || Spacewatch ||  || align=right | 1.8 km || 
|-id=144 bgcolor=#d6d6d6
| 607144 ||  || — || October 4, 1999 || Kitt Peak || Spacewatch ||  || align=right | 2.6 km || 
|-id=145 bgcolor=#d6d6d6
| 607145 ||  || — || October 6, 1999 || Kitt Peak || Spacewatch ||  || align=right | 2.7 km || 
|-id=146 bgcolor=#d6d6d6
| 607146 ||  || — || October 6, 1999 || Kitt Peak || Spacewatch ||  || align=right | 2.9 km || 
|-id=147 bgcolor=#fefefe
| 607147 ||  || — || October 6, 1999 || Kitt Peak || Spacewatch ||  || align=right data-sort-value="0.64" | 640 m || 
|-id=148 bgcolor=#E9E9E9
| 607148 ||  || — || October 6, 1999 || Kitt Peak || Spacewatch ||  || align=right | 1.4 km || 
|-id=149 bgcolor=#E9E9E9
| 607149 ||  || — || October 6, 1999 || Kitt Peak || Spacewatch ||  || align=right | 1.6 km || 
|-id=150 bgcolor=#E9E9E9
| 607150 ||  || — || October 7, 1999 || Kitt Peak || Spacewatch ||  || align=right | 1.4 km || 
|-id=151 bgcolor=#fefefe
| 607151 ||  || — || October 8, 1999 || Kitt Peak || Spacewatch ||  || align=right data-sort-value="0.58" | 580 m || 
|-id=152 bgcolor=#d6d6d6
| 607152 ||  || — || September 30, 1999 || Kitt Peak || Spacewatch ||  || align=right | 2.6 km || 
|-id=153 bgcolor=#d6d6d6
| 607153 ||  || — || October 9, 1999 || Kitt Peak || Spacewatch ||  || align=right | 1.6 km || 
|-id=154 bgcolor=#fefefe
| 607154 ||  || — || October 10, 1999 || Kitt Peak || Spacewatch ||  || align=right data-sort-value="0.60" | 600 m || 
|-id=155 bgcolor=#fefefe
| 607155 ||  || — || October 10, 1999 || Kitt Peak || Spacewatch ||  || align=right data-sort-value="0.73" | 730 m || 
|-id=156 bgcolor=#E9E9E9
| 607156 ||  || — || October 4, 1999 || Socorro || LINEAR ||  || align=right | 1.6 km || 
|-id=157 bgcolor=#E9E9E9
| 607157 ||  || — || September 18, 1999 || Kitt Peak || Spacewatch ||  || align=right | 1.2 km || 
|-id=158 bgcolor=#E9E9E9
| 607158 ||  || — || October 6, 1999 || Socorro || LINEAR ||  || align=right | 1.5 km || 
|-id=159 bgcolor=#E9E9E9
| 607159 ||  || — || October 3, 1999 || Socorro || LINEAR ||  || align=right | 1.2 km || 
|-id=160 bgcolor=#d6d6d6
| 607160 ||  || — || October 4, 1999 || Kitt Peak || Spacewatch ||  || align=right | 2.1 km || 
|-id=161 bgcolor=#d6d6d6
| 607161 ||  || — || October 4, 1999 || Kitt Peak || Spacewatch ||  || align=right | 2.5 km || 
|-id=162 bgcolor=#E9E9E9
| 607162 ||  || — || October 6, 1999 || Kitt Peak || Spacewatch ||  || align=right | 1.2 km || 
|-id=163 bgcolor=#E9E9E9
| 607163 ||  || — || October 11, 1999 || Kitt Peak || Spacewatch ||  || align=right | 1.2 km || 
|-id=164 bgcolor=#d6d6d6
| 607164 ||  || — || December 3, 2010 || Mount Lemmon || Mount Lemmon Survey ||  || align=right | 2.5 km || 
|-id=165 bgcolor=#E9E9E9
| 607165 ||  || — || December 4, 2012 || Kitt Peak || Spacewatch ||  || align=right | 1.7 km || 
|-id=166 bgcolor=#fefefe
| 607166 ||  || — || March 10, 2008 || Kitt Peak || Spacewatch ||  || align=right data-sort-value="0.78" | 780 m || 
|-id=167 bgcolor=#d6d6d6
| 607167 ||  || — || November 13, 2010 || Mount Lemmon || Mount Lemmon Survey ||  || align=right | 2.5 km || 
|-id=168 bgcolor=#fefefe
| 607168 ||  || — || August 19, 2006 || Kitt Peak || Spacewatch ||  || align=right data-sort-value="0.74" | 740 m || 
|-id=169 bgcolor=#d6d6d6
| 607169 ||  || — || November 12, 2010 || Kitt Peak || Spacewatch ||  || align=right | 2.6 km || 
|-id=170 bgcolor=#d6d6d6
| 607170 ||  || — || November 22, 2015 || Mount Lemmon || Mount Lemmon Survey ||  || align=right | 2.1 km || 
|-id=171 bgcolor=#E9E9E9
| 607171 ||  || — || September 22, 2003 || Kitt Peak || Spacewatch ||  || align=right | 1.1 km || 
|-id=172 bgcolor=#fefefe
| 607172 ||  || — || February 11, 2016 || Mount Lemmon || Mount Lemmon Survey ||  || align=right data-sort-value="0.60" | 600 m || 
|-id=173 bgcolor=#E9E9E9
| 607173 ||  || — || February 17, 2010 || Kitt Peak || Spacewatch ||  || align=right | 1.5 km || 
|-id=174 bgcolor=#fefefe
| 607174 ||  || — || July 14, 2013 || Haleakala || Pan-STARRS ||  || align=right data-sort-value="0.51" | 510 m || 
|-id=175 bgcolor=#E9E9E9
| 607175 ||  || — || October 8, 2012 || Kitt Peak || Spacewatch ||  || align=right | 1.2 km || 
|-id=176 bgcolor=#E9E9E9
| 607176 ||  || — || June 8, 2011 || Mount Lemmon || Mount Lemmon Survey ||  || align=right | 1.5 km || 
|-id=177 bgcolor=#d6d6d6
| 607177 ||  || — || September 10, 2004 || Kitt Peak || Spacewatch ||  || align=right | 1.8 km || 
|-id=178 bgcolor=#d6d6d6
| 607178 ||  || — || February 25, 2018 || Mount Lemmon || Mount Lemmon Survey ||  || align=right | 2.4 km || 
|-id=179 bgcolor=#d6d6d6
| 607179 ||  || — || September 13, 2004 || Kitt Peak || Spacewatch ||  || align=right | 2.1 km || 
|-id=180 bgcolor=#d6d6d6
| 607180 ||  || — || October 13, 1999 || Apache Point || SDSS Collaboration ||  || align=right | 1.8 km || 
|-id=181 bgcolor=#d6d6d6
| 607181 ||  || — || October 13, 1999 || Apache Point || SDSS Collaboration ||  || align=right | 1.8 km || 
|-id=182 bgcolor=#fefefe
| 607182 ||  || — || October 8, 1999 || Kitt Peak || Spacewatch ||  || align=right data-sort-value="0.50" | 500 m || 
|-id=183 bgcolor=#d6d6d6
| 607183 ||  || — || October 31, 1999 || Kitt Peak || Spacewatch ||  || align=right | 2.5 km || 
|-id=184 bgcolor=#d6d6d6
| 607184 ||  || — || October 12, 1999 || Kitt Peak || Spacewatch ||  || align=right | 2.4 km || 
|-id=185 bgcolor=#d6d6d6
| 607185 ||  || — || October 14, 1999 || Kitt Peak || Spacewatch ||  || align=right | 3.0 km || 
|-id=186 bgcolor=#d6d6d6
| 607186 ||  || — || October 19, 1999 || Kitt Peak || Spacewatch ||  || align=right | 2.5 km || 
|-id=187 bgcolor=#E9E9E9
| 607187 ||  || — || October 19, 1999 || Kitt Peak || Spacewatch ||  || align=right | 1.4 km || 
|-id=188 bgcolor=#fefefe
| 607188 ||  || — || October 20, 1999 || Kitt Peak || Spacewatch ||  || align=right data-sort-value="0.75" | 750 m || 
|-id=189 bgcolor=#E9E9E9
| 607189 ||  || — || May 25, 2006 || Mount Lemmon || Mount Lemmon Survey ||  || align=right | 2.2 km || 
|-id=190 bgcolor=#fefefe
| 607190 ||  || — || October 19, 1999 || Kitt Peak || Spacewatch ||  || align=right data-sort-value="0.59" | 590 m || 
|-id=191 bgcolor=#d6d6d6
| 607191 ||  || — || July 1, 2014 || Haleakala || Pan-STARRS ||  || align=right | 2.1 km || 
|-id=192 bgcolor=#fefefe
| 607192 ||  || — || February 23, 2017 || Mount Lemmon || Mount Lemmon Survey || H || align=right data-sort-value="0.56" | 560 m || 
|-id=193 bgcolor=#E9E9E9
| 607193 ||  || — || October 17, 1999 || Kitt Peak || Spacewatch ||  || align=right | 1.5 km || 
|-id=194 bgcolor=#d6d6d6
| 607194 ||  || — || November 9, 1999 || Kitt Peak || Spacewatch ||  || align=right | 2.7 km || 
|-id=195 bgcolor=#d6d6d6
| 607195 ||  || — || November 1, 1999 || Kitt Peak || Spacewatch ||  || align=right | 2.5 km || 
|-id=196 bgcolor=#d6d6d6
| 607196 ||  || — || November 10, 1999 || Kitt Peak || Spacewatch ||  || align=right | 2.3 km || 
|-id=197 bgcolor=#E9E9E9
| 607197 ||  || — || November 10, 1999 || Kitt Peak || Spacewatch ||  || align=right | 1.5 km || 
|-id=198 bgcolor=#E9E9E9
| 607198 ||  || — || November 14, 1999 || Socorro || LINEAR ||  || align=right | 1.8 km || 
|-id=199 bgcolor=#E9E9E9
| 607199 ||  || — || November 1, 1999 || Kitt Peak || Spacewatch ||  || align=right | 1.2 km || 
|-id=200 bgcolor=#E9E9E9
| 607200 ||  || — || November 2, 1999 || Kitt Peak || Spacewatch ||  || align=right | 1.1 km || 
|}

607201–607300 

|-bgcolor=#d6d6d6
| 607201 ||  || — || November 4, 1999 || Kitt Peak || Spacewatch ||  || align=right | 2.6 km || 
|-id=202 bgcolor=#d6d6d6
| 607202 ||  || — || November 5, 1999 || Kitt Peak || Spacewatch ||  || align=right | 1.6 km || 
|-id=203 bgcolor=#E9E9E9
| 607203 ||  || — || November 5, 1999 || Kitt Peak || Spacewatch ||  || align=right | 1.7 km || 
|-id=204 bgcolor=#E9E9E9
| 607204 ||  || — || October 17, 2003 || Kitt Peak || Spacewatch ||  || align=right | 1.6 km || 
|-id=205 bgcolor=#E9E9E9
| 607205 ||  || — || October 23, 2012 || Mount Lemmon || Mount Lemmon Survey ||  || align=right | 1.1 km || 
|-id=206 bgcolor=#d6d6d6
| 607206 ||  || — || October 8, 2015 || Haleakala || Pan-STARRS ||  || align=right | 2.2 km || 
|-id=207 bgcolor=#d6d6d6
| 607207 ||  || — || December 14, 2015 || Mount Lemmon || Mount Lemmon Survey ||  || align=right | 2.2 km || 
|-id=208 bgcolor=#E9E9E9
| 607208 ||  || — || January 17, 2005 || Kitt Peak || Spacewatch ||  || align=right | 1.3 km || 
|-id=209 bgcolor=#d6d6d6
| 607209 ||  || — || October 29, 2010 || Mount Lemmon || Mount Lemmon Survey ||  || align=right | 2.6 km || 
|-id=210 bgcolor=#d6d6d6
| 607210 ||  || — || November 1, 1999 || Kitt Peak || Spacewatch ||  || align=right | 2.1 km || 
|-id=211 bgcolor=#d6d6d6
| 607211 ||  || — || November 30, 1999 || Kitt Peak || Spacewatch ||  || align=right | 2.7 km || 
|-id=212 bgcolor=#d6d6d6
| 607212 ||  || — || November 17, 1999 || Kitt Peak || Spacewatch ||  || align=right | 1.6 km || 
|-id=213 bgcolor=#E9E9E9
| 607213 ||  || — || October 8, 2012 || Haleakala || Pan-STARRS ||  || align=right data-sort-value="0.95" | 950 m || 
|-id=214 bgcolor=#d6d6d6
| 607214 ||  || — || December 2, 1999 || Kitt Peak || Spacewatch ||  || align=right | 3.9 km || 
|-id=215 bgcolor=#E9E9E9
| 607215 ||  || — || December 7, 1999 || Kitt Peak || Spacewatch ||  || align=right | 1.8 km || 
|-id=216 bgcolor=#d6d6d6
| 607216 ||  || — || December 7, 1999 || Kitt Peak || Spacewatch ||  || align=right | 2.3 km || 
|-id=217 bgcolor=#E9E9E9
| 607217 ||  || — || December 14, 1999 || Socorro || LINEAR ||  || align=right | 2.1 km || 
|-id=218 bgcolor=#d6d6d6
| 607218 ||  || — || December 13, 1999 || Kitt Peak || Spacewatch ||  || align=right | 2.4 km || 
|-id=219 bgcolor=#d6d6d6
| 607219 ||  || — || December 14, 1999 || Kitt Peak || Spacewatch ||  || align=right | 2.9 km || 
|-id=220 bgcolor=#E9E9E9
| 607220 ||  || — || December 5, 1999 || Kitt Peak || Spacewatch ||  || align=right | 1.4 km || 
|-id=221 bgcolor=#d6d6d6
| 607221 ||  || — || December 12, 1999 || Kitt Peak || Spacewatch ||  || align=right | 1.7 km || 
|-id=222 bgcolor=#E9E9E9
| 607222 ||  || — || December 12, 1999 || Kitt Peak || Spacewatch ||  || align=right | 1.8 km || 
|-id=223 bgcolor=#fefefe
| 607223 ||  || — || December 12, 1999 || Kitt Peak || Spacewatch ||  || align=right | 1.0 km || 
|-id=224 bgcolor=#fefefe
| 607224 ||  || — || December 7, 1999 || Kitt Peak || Spacewatch ||  || align=right data-sort-value="0.64" | 640 m || 
|-id=225 bgcolor=#C2FFFF
| 607225 ||  || — || February 5, 2013 || Kitt Peak || Spacewatch || L4 || align=right | 7.7 km || 
|-id=226 bgcolor=#E9E9E9
| 607226 ||  || — || October 21, 2012 || Haleakala || Pan-STARRS ||  || align=right | 1.3 km || 
|-id=227 bgcolor=#d6d6d6
| 607227 ||  || — || March 29, 2012 || Haleakala || Pan-STARRS ||  || align=right | 2.0 km || 
|-id=228 bgcolor=#d6d6d6
| 607228 ||  || — || December 7, 1999 || Kitt Peak || Spacewatch ||  || align=right | 2.4 km || 
|-id=229 bgcolor=#d6d6d6
| 607229 ||  || — || February 6, 2000 || Kitt Peak || Spacewatch ||  || align=right | 2.5 km || 
|-id=230 bgcolor=#d6d6d6
| 607230 ||  || — || December 16, 1999 || Kitt Peak || Spacewatch ||  || align=right | 3.0 km || 
|-id=231 bgcolor=#d6d6d6
| 607231 ||  || — || December 16, 1999 || Kitt Peak || Spacewatch ||  || align=right | 3.2 km || 
|-id=232 bgcolor=#d6d6d6
| 607232 ||  || — || October 15, 2015 || Mount Lemmon || Mount Lemmon Survey ||  || align=right | 2.2 km || 
|-id=233 bgcolor=#d6d6d6
| 607233 ||  || — || November 14, 2015 || Mount Lemmon || Mount Lemmon Survey ||  || align=right | 2.5 km || 
|-id=234 bgcolor=#fefefe
| 607234 ||  || — || January 3, 2011 || Catalina || CSS || H || align=right data-sort-value="0.67" | 670 m || 
|-id=235 bgcolor=#d6d6d6
| 607235 ||  || — || December 14, 1999 || Kitt Peak || Spacewatch ||  || align=right | 3.7 km || 
|-id=236 bgcolor=#d6d6d6
| 607236 ||  || — || January 8, 2000 || Kitt Peak || Spacewatch ||  || align=right | 2.0 km || 
|-id=237 bgcolor=#E9E9E9
| 607237 ||  || — || January 12, 2000 || Kitt Peak || Spacewatch ||  || align=right | 1.6 km || 
|-id=238 bgcolor=#E9E9E9
| 607238 ||  || — || December 29, 2008 || Kitt Peak || Spacewatch ||  || align=right | 1.8 km || 
|-id=239 bgcolor=#fefefe
| 607239 ||  || — || August 29, 2009 || Catalina || CSS ||  || align=right data-sort-value="0.77" | 770 m || 
|-id=240 bgcolor=#fefefe
| 607240 ||  || — || October 3, 2006 || Mount Lemmon || Mount Lemmon Survey ||  || align=right data-sort-value="0.57" | 570 m || 
|-id=241 bgcolor=#E9E9E9
| 607241 ||  || — || January 2, 2009 || Mount Lemmon || Mount Lemmon Survey ||  || align=right | 1.2 km || 
|-id=242 bgcolor=#E9E9E9
| 607242 ||  || — || July 25, 2015 || Haleakala || Pan-STARRS ||  || align=right | 1.7 km || 
|-id=243 bgcolor=#d6d6d6
| 607243 ||  || — || November 29, 2014 || Mount Lemmon || Mount Lemmon Survey || 3:2 || align=right | 3.4 km || 
|-id=244 bgcolor=#E9E9E9
| 607244 ||  || — || January 28, 2000 || Kitt Peak || Spacewatch ||  || align=right | 1.3 km || 
|-id=245 bgcolor=#fefefe
| 607245 ||  || — || January 28, 2000 || Kitt Peak || Spacewatch ||  || align=right data-sort-value="0.78" | 780 m || 
|-id=246 bgcolor=#E9E9E9
| 607246 ||  || — || January 28, 2000 || Kitt Peak || Spacewatch ||  || align=right | 1.7 km || 
|-id=247 bgcolor=#d6d6d6
| 607247 ||  || — || January 17, 2000 || Mauna Kea || C. Veillet ||  || align=right | 3.2 km || 
|-id=248 bgcolor=#d6d6d6
| 607248 ||  || — || January 27, 2000 || Kitt Peak || Spacewatch ||  || align=right | 3.0 km || 
|-id=249 bgcolor=#E9E9E9
| 607249 ||  || — || January 28, 2000 || Kitt Peak || Spacewatch ||  || align=right | 1.5 km || 
|-id=250 bgcolor=#fefefe
| 607250 ||  || — || December 5, 2010 || Mount Lemmon || Mount Lemmon Survey ||  || align=right data-sort-value="0.55" | 550 m || 
|-id=251 bgcolor=#E9E9E9
| 607251 ||  || — || January 30, 2000 || Kitt Peak || Spacewatch ||  || align=right | 1.5 km || 
|-id=252 bgcolor=#d6d6d6
| 607252 ||  || — || January 14, 2011 || Kitt Peak || Spacewatch ||  || align=right | 3.5 km || 
|-id=253 bgcolor=#E9E9E9
| 607253 ||  || — || July 12, 2015 || Haleakala || Pan-STARRS ||  || align=right | 2.3 km || 
|-id=254 bgcolor=#d6d6d6
| 607254 ||  || — || December 3, 2015 || Mount Lemmon || Mount Lemmon Survey ||  || align=right | 1.9 km || 
|-id=255 bgcolor=#E9E9E9
| 607255 ||  || — || February 2, 2000 || Socorro || LINEAR ||  || align=right | 2.6 km || 
|-id=256 bgcolor=#d6d6d6
| 607256 ||  || — || January 30, 2000 || Kitt Peak || Spacewatch ||  || align=right | 2.9 km || 
|-id=257 bgcolor=#E9E9E9
| 607257 ||  || — || February 4, 2000 || Kitt Peak || Spacewatch ||  || align=right | 1.7 km || 
|-id=258 bgcolor=#E9E9E9
| 607258 ||  || — || February 5, 2000 || Kitt Peak || Kitt Peak Obs. ||  || align=right | 1.7 km || 
|-id=259 bgcolor=#E9E9E9
| 607259 ||  || — || February 2, 2000 || Kitt Peak || Spacewatch ||  || align=right | 1.4 km || 
|-id=260 bgcolor=#d6d6d6
| 607260 ||  || — || February 3, 2000 || Kitt Peak || Spacewatch ||  || align=right | 2.1 km || 
|-id=261 bgcolor=#d6d6d6
| 607261 ||  || — || February 4, 2000 || Kitt Peak || Spacewatch ||  || align=right | 2.8 km || 
|-id=262 bgcolor=#d6d6d6
| 607262 ||  || — || February 4, 2000 || Kitt Peak || Spacewatch || Tj (2.99) || align=right | 3.1 km || 
|-id=263 bgcolor=#d6d6d6
| 607263 ||  || — || January 28, 2000 || Kitt Peak || Spacewatch || VER || align=right | 2.7 km || 
|-id=264 bgcolor=#E9E9E9
| 607264 ||  || — || February 6, 2000 || Kitt Peak || Spacewatch ||  || align=right | 1.6 km || 
|-id=265 bgcolor=#d6d6d6
| 607265 ||  || — || February 4, 2000 || Kitt Peak || Spacewatch ||  || align=right | 2.3 km || 
|-id=266 bgcolor=#E9E9E9
| 607266 ||  || — || May 11, 2005 || Mount Lemmon || Mount Lemmon Survey ||  || align=right | 1.5 km || 
|-id=267 bgcolor=#E9E9E9
| 607267 ||  || — || September 21, 2003 || Kitt Peak || Spacewatch ||  || align=right | 1.3 km || 
|-id=268 bgcolor=#d6d6d6
| 607268 ||  || — || February 25, 2006 || Mount Lemmon || Mount Lemmon Survey ||  || align=right | 2.9 km || 
|-id=269 bgcolor=#fefefe
| 607269 ||  || — || February 12, 2000 || Apache Point || SDSS Collaboration ||  || align=right data-sort-value="0.52" | 520 m || 
|-id=270 bgcolor=#d6d6d6
| 607270 ||  || — || September 25, 2009 || Kitt Peak || Spacewatch ||  || align=right | 2.3 km || 
|-id=271 bgcolor=#d6d6d6
| 607271 ||  || — || February 13, 2011 || Mount Lemmon || Mount Lemmon Survey ||  || align=right | 2.5 km || 
|-id=272 bgcolor=#fefefe
| 607272 ||  || — || January 26, 2011 || Kitt Peak || Spacewatch ||  || align=right data-sort-value="0.64" | 640 m || 
|-id=273 bgcolor=#E9E9E9
| 607273 ||  || — || September 27, 2016 || Haleakala || Pan-STARRS ||  || align=right | 1.6 km || 
|-id=274 bgcolor=#d6d6d6
| 607274 ||  || — || April 18, 2007 || Mount Lemmon || Mount Lemmon Survey ||  || align=right | 2.5 km || 
|-id=275 bgcolor=#d6d6d6
| 607275 ||  || — || January 31, 2006 || Kitt Peak || Spacewatch ||  || align=right | 2.5 km || 
|-id=276 bgcolor=#d6d6d6
| 607276 ||  || — || February 11, 2000 || Kitt Peak || Spacewatch ||  || align=right | 2.9 km || 
|-id=277 bgcolor=#d6d6d6
| 607277 ||  || — || September 9, 2008 || Mount Lemmon || Mount Lemmon Survey ||  || align=right | 2.8 km || 
|-id=278 bgcolor=#fefefe
| 607278 ||  || — || February 27, 2000 || Kitt Peak || Spacewatch ||  || align=right data-sort-value="0.86" | 860 m || 
|-id=279 bgcolor=#E9E9E9
| 607279 ||  || — || February 29, 2000 || Socorro || LINEAR ||  || align=right | 2.2 km || 
|-id=280 bgcolor=#E9E9E9
| 607280 ||  || — || March 3, 2000 || Socorro || LINEAR ||  || align=right | 1.5 km || 
|-id=281 bgcolor=#E9E9E9
| 607281 ||  || — || November 14, 2007 || Kitt Peak || Spacewatch ||  || align=right | 2.5 km || 
|-id=282 bgcolor=#E9E9E9
| 607282 ||  || — || March 12, 2005 || Mount Lemmon || Mount Lemmon Survey ||  || align=right | 1.9 km || 
|-id=283 bgcolor=#E9E9E9
| 607283 ||  || — || December 18, 2003 || Kitt Peak || Spacewatch ||  || align=right | 1.9 km || 
|-id=284 bgcolor=#fefefe
| 607284 ||  || — || January 25, 2015 || Haleakala || Pan-STARRS ||  || align=right data-sort-value="0.71" | 710 m || 
|-id=285 bgcolor=#E9E9E9
| 607285 ||  || — || December 22, 2012 || Haleakala || Pan-STARRS ||  || align=right | 1.8 km || 
|-id=286 bgcolor=#d6d6d6
| 607286 ||  || — || January 30, 2017 || Haleakala || Pan-STARRS ||  || align=right | 2.9 km || 
|-id=287 bgcolor=#E9E9E9
| 607287 ||  || — || February 19, 2009 || Kitt Peak || Spacewatch ||  || align=right | 1.5 km || 
|-id=288 bgcolor=#d6d6d6
| 607288 ||  || — || March 19, 2017 || Haleakala || Pan-STARRS ||  || align=right | 2.1 km || 
|-id=289 bgcolor=#E9E9E9
| 607289 ||  || — || November 5, 2016 || Mount Lemmon || Mount Lemmon Survey ||  || align=right | 1.7 km || 
|-id=290 bgcolor=#E9E9E9
| 607290 ||  || — || February 19, 2009 || Kitt Peak || Spacewatch ||  || align=right | 1.3 km || 
|-id=291 bgcolor=#E9E9E9
| 607291 ||  || — || June 18, 2015 || Haleakala || Pan-STARRS ||  || align=right | 1.7 km || 
|-id=292 bgcolor=#d6d6d6
| 607292 ||  || — || March 25, 2000 || Kitt Peak || Spacewatch ||  || align=right | 2.3 km || 
|-id=293 bgcolor=#E9E9E9
| 607293 ||  || — || March 30, 2000 || Kitt Peak || Spacewatch ||  || align=right | 2.1 km || 
|-id=294 bgcolor=#E9E9E9
| 607294 ||  || — || May 8, 2005 || Kitt Peak || Spacewatch ||  || align=right | 1.8 km || 
|-id=295 bgcolor=#fefefe
| 607295 ||  || — || March 25, 2000 || Kitt Peak || Spacewatch ||  || align=right data-sort-value="0.87" | 870 m || 
|-id=296 bgcolor=#E9E9E9
| 607296 ||  || — || December 4, 2007 || Mount Lemmon || Mount Lemmon Survey ||  || align=right | 1.6 km || 
|-id=297 bgcolor=#fefefe
| 607297 ||  || — || March 25, 2000 || Kitt Peak || Spacewatch ||  || align=right data-sort-value="0.53" | 530 m || 
|-id=298 bgcolor=#d6d6d6
| 607298 ||  || — || April 2, 2000 || Kitt Peak || Spacewatch ||  || align=right | 2.0 km || 
|-id=299 bgcolor=#E9E9E9
| 607299 ||  || — || April 5, 2000 || Kitt Peak || Spacewatch ||  || align=right | 2.1 km || 
|-id=300 bgcolor=#E9E9E9
| 607300 ||  || — || April 7, 2000 || Kitt Peak || Spacewatch ||  || align=right | 2.4 km || 
|}

607301–607400 

|-bgcolor=#fefefe
| 607301 ||  || — || March 27, 2000 || Kitt Peak || Spacewatch ||  || align=right data-sort-value="0.72" | 720 m || 
|-id=302 bgcolor=#fefefe
| 607302 ||  || — || April 5, 2000 || Socorro || LINEAR ||  || align=right data-sort-value="0.65" | 650 m || 
|-id=303 bgcolor=#fefefe
| 607303 ||  || — || September 14, 2013 || Mount Lemmon || Mount Lemmon Survey ||  || align=right data-sort-value="0.72" | 720 m || 
|-id=304 bgcolor=#E9E9E9
| 607304 ||  || — || April 5, 2000 || Kitt Peak || Spacewatch ||  || align=right | 2.3 km || 
|-id=305 bgcolor=#d6d6d6
| 607305 ||  || — || August 27, 2014 || Haleakala || Pan-STARRS ||  || align=right | 2.9 km || 
|-id=306 bgcolor=#E9E9E9
| 607306 ||  || — || April 27, 2000 || Kitt Peak || Spacewatch ||  || align=right | 1.9 km || 
|-id=307 bgcolor=#fefefe
| 607307 ||  || — || April 27, 2000 || Kitt Peak || Spacewatch ||  || align=right data-sort-value="0.66" | 660 m || 
|-id=308 bgcolor=#fefefe
| 607308 ||  || — || March 21, 2015 || Catalina || CSS ||  || align=right data-sort-value="0.92" | 920 m || 
|-id=309 bgcolor=#E9E9E9
| 607309 ||  || — || February 24, 2009 || Mount Lemmon || Mount Lemmon Survey ||  || align=right | 2.6 km || 
|-id=310 bgcolor=#E9E9E9
| 607310 ||  || — || May 1, 2000 || Kitt Peak || Spacewatch ||  || align=right | 1.9 km || 
|-id=311 bgcolor=#E9E9E9
| 607311 ||  || — || August 19, 2001 || Cerro Tololo || Cerro Tololo Obs. ||  || align=right | 1.8 km || 
|-id=312 bgcolor=#fefefe
| 607312 ||  || — || July 9, 2016 || Haleakala || Pan-STARRS ||  || align=right data-sort-value="0.62" | 620 m || 
|-id=313 bgcolor=#fefefe
| 607313 ||  || — || April 22, 2015 || Catalina || CSS ||  || align=right data-sort-value="0.69" | 690 m || 
|-id=314 bgcolor=#fefefe
| 607314 ||  || — || May 29, 2000 || Kitt Peak || Spacewatch ||  || align=right data-sort-value="0.86" | 860 m || 
|-id=315 bgcolor=#E9E9E9
| 607315 ||  || — || July 30, 2000 || Cerro Tololo || M. W. Buie, S. D. Kern ||  || align=right | 1.8 km || 
|-id=316 bgcolor=#d6d6d6
| 607316 ||  || — || October 27, 2006 || Mount Lemmon || Mount Lemmon Survey ||  || align=right | 2.4 km || 
|-id=317 bgcolor=#E9E9E9
| 607317 ||  || — || July 4, 2016 || Haleakala || Pan-STARRS ||  || align=right data-sort-value="0.70" | 700 m || 
|-id=318 bgcolor=#d6d6d6
| 607318 ||  || — || November 1, 2006 || Kitt Peak || Spacewatch ||  || align=right | 1.9 km || 
|-id=319 bgcolor=#E9E9E9
| 607319 ||  || — || July 31, 2000 || Cerro Tololo || M. W. Buie, S. D. Kern ||  || align=right data-sort-value="0.73" | 730 m || 
|-id=320 bgcolor=#fefefe
| 607320 ||  || — || December 11, 2013 || Haleakala || Pan-STARRS ||  || align=right data-sort-value="0.87" | 870 m || 
|-id=321 bgcolor=#d6d6d6
| 607321 ||  || — || February 28, 2008 || Mount Lemmon || Mount Lemmon Survey ||  || align=right | 1.8 km || 
|-id=322 bgcolor=#fefefe
| 607322 ||  || — || September 12, 2007 || Kitt Peak || Spacewatch ||  || align=right data-sort-value="0.74" | 740 m || 
|-id=323 bgcolor=#fefefe
| 607323 ||  || — || November 1, 2005 || Mount Lemmon || Mount Lemmon Survey ||  || align=right data-sort-value="0.78" | 780 m || 
|-id=324 bgcolor=#d6d6d6
| 607324 ||  || — || August 26, 2000 || Cerro Tololo || R. Millis, L. H. Wasserman ||  || align=right | 2.1 km || 
|-id=325 bgcolor=#E9E9E9
| 607325 ||  || — || August 25, 2000 || Cerro Tololo || R. Millis, L. H. Wasserman ||  || align=right data-sort-value="0.65" | 650 m || 
|-id=326 bgcolor=#d6d6d6
| 607326 ||  || — || August 25, 2000 || Cerro Tololo || R. Millis, L. H. Wasserman ||  || align=right | 2.1 km || 
|-id=327 bgcolor=#E9E9E9
| 607327 ||  || — || August 20, 2000 || Kitt Peak || Spacewatch ||  || align=right | 1.1 km || 
|-id=328 bgcolor=#fefefe
| 607328 ||  || — || August 31, 2000 || Kitt Peak || Spacewatch ||  || align=right data-sort-value="0.56" | 560 m || 
|-id=329 bgcolor=#fefefe
| 607329 ||  || — || October 7, 2007 || Kitt Peak || Spacewatch ||  || align=right data-sort-value="0.74" | 740 m || 
|-id=330 bgcolor=#fefefe
| 607330 ||  || — || January 2, 2012 || Mount Lemmon || Mount Lemmon Survey ||  || align=right data-sort-value="0.55" | 550 m || 
|-id=331 bgcolor=#E9E9E9
| 607331 ||  || — || March 26, 2007 || Kitt Peak || Spacewatch ||  || align=right data-sort-value="0.72" | 720 m || 
|-id=332 bgcolor=#E9E9E9
| 607332 ||  || — || April 23, 2015 || Haleakala || Pan-STARRS ||  || align=right data-sort-value="0.72" | 720 m || 
|-id=333 bgcolor=#fefefe
| 607333 ||  || — || August 27, 2014 || Haleakala || Pan-STARRS ||  || align=right data-sort-value="0.42" | 420 m || 
|-id=334 bgcolor=#d6d6d6
| 607334 ||  || — || January 15, 2018 || Haleakala || Pan-STARRS ||  || align=right | 1.6 km || 
|-id=335 bgcolor=#fefefe
| 607335 ||  || — || September 2, 2010 || Mount Lemmon || Mount Lemmon Survey ||  || align=right data-sort-value="0.64" | 640 m || 
|-id=336 bgcolor=#fefefe
| 607336 ||  || — || November 11, 2004 || Kitt Peak || Kitt Peak Obs. ||  || align=right data-sort-value="0.51" | 510 m || 
|-id=337 bgcolor=#E9E9E9
| 607337 ||  || — || August 20, 2004 || Kitt Peak || Spacewatch ||  || align=right data-sort-value="0.76" | 760 m || 
|-id=338 bgcolor=#E9E9E9
| 607338 ||  || — || September 5, 2000 || Apache Point || SDSS Collaboration ||  || align=right data-sort-value="0.83" | 830 m || 
|-id=339 bgcolor=#d6d6d6
| 607339 ||  || — || March 11, 2008 || Kitt Peak || Spacewatch ||  || align=right | 2.2 km || 
|-id=340 bgcolor=#fefefe
| 607340 ||  || — || December 14, 2001 || Kitt Peak || Spacewatch ||  || align=right data-sort-value="0.82" | 820 m || 
|-id=341 bgcolor=#E9E9E9
| 607341 ||  || — || October 12, 2004 || Kitt Peak || L. H. Wasserman, J. R. Lovering ||  || align=right data-sort-value="0.66" | 660 m || 
|-id=342 bgcolor=#E9E9E9
| 607342 ||  || — || March 11, 2002 || Palomar || NEAT ||  || align=right | 1.1 km || 
|-id=343 bgcolor=#fefefe
| 607343 ||  || — || February 20, 2009 || Kitt Peak || Spacewatch ||  || align=right data-sort-value="0.66" | 660 m || 
|-id=344 bgcolor=#fefefe
| 607344 ||  || — || March 21, 2004 || Kitt Peak || Spacewatch || H || align=right data-sort-value="0.55" | 550 m || 
|-id=345 bgcolor=#fefefe
| 607345 ||  || — || October 4, 2007 || Kitt Peak || Spacewatch ||  || align=right data-sort-value="0.74" | 740 m || 
|-id=346 bgcolor=#E9E9E9
| 607346 ||  || — || December 30, 2013 || Mount Lemmon || Mount Lemmon Survey ||  || align=right data-sort-value="0.60" | 600 m || 
|-id=347 bgcolor=#d6d6d6
| 607347 ||  || — || December 24, 2011 || Mount Lemmon || Mount Lemmon Survey ||  || align=right | 2.1 km || 
|-id=348 bgcolor=#d6d6d6
| 607348 ||  || — || January 16, 2009 || Kitt Peak || Spacewatch || 7:4 || align=right | 3.9 km || 
|-id=349 bgcolor=#d6d6d6
| 607349 ||  || — || October 9, 2005 || Kitt Peak || Spacewatch ||  || align=right | 1.8 km || 
|-id=350 bgcolor=#d6d6d6
| 607350 ||  || — || January 17, 2013 || Kitt Peak || Spacewatch ||  || align=right | 2.5 km || 
|-id=351 bgcolor=#E9E9E9
| 607351 ||  || — || September 5, 2008 || Kitt Peak || Spacewatch ||  || align=right | 1.0 km || 
|-id=352 bgcolor=#E9E9E9
| 607352 ||  || — || June 12, 2016 || Mount Lemmon || Mount Lemmon Survey ||  || align=right data-sort-value="0.74" | 740 m || 
|-id=353 bgcolor=#fefefe
| 607353 ||  || — || October 15, 2007 || Kitt Peak || Spacewatch ||  || align=right data-sort-value="0.53" | 530 m || 
|-id=354 bgcolor=#fefefe
| 607354 ||  || — || October 1, 2000 || Socorro || LINEAR ||  || align=right data-sort-value="0.84" | 840 m || 
|-id=355 bgcolor=#E9E9E9
| 607355 ||  || — || January 7, 2010 || Kitt Peak || Spacewatch ||  || align=right data-sort-value="0.78" | 780 m || 
|-id=356 bgcolor=#d6d6d6
| 607356 ||  || — || August 28, 2005 || Kitt Peak || Spacewatch ||  || align=right | 2.1 km || 
|-id=357 bgcolor=#E9E9E9
| 607357 ||  || — || August 27, 2016 || Haleakala || Pan-STARRS ||  || align=right | 1.0 km || 
|-id=358 bgcolor=#d6d6d6
| 607358 ||  || — || September 23, 2015 || Haleakala || Pan-STARRS ||  || align=right | 2.6 km || 
|-id=359 bgcolor=#E9E9E9
| 607359 ||  || — || September 17, 2004 || Anderson Mesa || LONEOS ||  || align=right | 1.0 km || 
|-id=360 bgcolor=#d6d6d6
| 607360 ||  || — || February 26, 2008 || Mount Lemmon || Mount Lemmon Survey ||  || align=right | 1.9 km || 
|-id=361 bgcolor=#d6d6d6
| 607361 ||  || — || March 23, 2013 || Mount Lemmon || Mount Lemmon Survey ||  || align=right | 2.7 km || 
|-id=362 bgcolor=#fefefe
| 607362 ||  || — || October 9, 2007 || Mount Lemmon || Mount Lemmon Survey ||  || align=right data-sort-value="0.56" | 560 m || 
|-id=363 bgcolor=#d6d6d6
| 607363 ||  || — || October 1, 2000 || Apache Point || SDSS Collaboration ||  || align=right | 2.5 km || 
|-id=364 bgcolor=#fefefe
| 607364 ||  || — || November 2, 2007 || Mount Lemmon || Mount Lemmon Survey ||  || align=right data-sort-value="0.51" | 510 m || 
|-id=365 bgcolor=#d6d6d6
| 607365 ||  || — || January 11, 2018 || Haleakala || Pan-STARRS ||  || align=right | 1.8 km || 
|-id=366 bgcolor=#d6d6d6
| 607366 ||  || — || July 24, 2015 || Haleakala || Pan-STARRS ||  || align=right | 1.5 km || 
|-id=367 bgcolor=#d6d6d6
| 607367 ||  || — || September 23, 2005 || Kitt Peak || Spacewatch ||  || align=right | 2.3 km || 
|-id=368 bgcolor=#E9E9E9
| 607368 ||  || — || October 7, 2008 || Kitt Peak || Spacewatch ||  || align=right data-sort-value="0.84" | 840 m || 
|-id=369 bgcolor=#fefefe
| 607369 ||  || — || September 15, 2010 || Mount Lemmon || Mount Lemmon Survey ||  || align=right data-sort-value="0.48" | 480 m || 
|-id=370 bgcolor=#E9E9E9
| 607370 ||  || — || November 25, 2000 || Kitt Peak || Spacewatch ||  || align=right data-sort-value="0.71" | 710 m || 
|-id=371 bgcolor=#E9E9E9
| 607371 ||  || — || November 28, 2000 || Kitt Peak || Spacewatch ||  || align=right data-sort-value="0.99" | 990 m || 
|-id=372 bgcolor=#E9E9E9
| 607372 Colombounilanka ||  ||  || November 30, 2000 || Kitt Peak || N. Samarasinha, T. Lauer ||  || align=right | 1.3 km || 
|-id=373 bgcolor=#fefefe
| 607373 ||  || — || November 17, 2007 || Kitt Peak || Spacewatch ||  || align=right data-sort-value="0.61" | 610 m || 
|-id=374 bgcolor=#E9E9E9
| 607374 ||  || — || October 10, 2008 || Kitt Peak || Spacewatch ||  || align=right data-sort-value="0.79" | 790 m || 
|-id=375 bgcolor=#E9E9E9
| 607375 ||  || — || March 18, 2010 || Mount Lemmon || Mount Lemmon Survey ||  || align=right data-sort-value="0.91" | 910 m || 
|-id=376 bgcolor=#d6d6d6
| 607376 ||  || — || April 12, 2013 || Haleakala || Pan-STARRS ||  || align=right | 2.6 km || 
|-id=377 bgcolor=#E9E9E9
| 607377 ||  || — || December 25, 2013 || Mount Lemmon || Mount Lemmon Survey ||  || align=right data-sort-value="0.88" | 880 m || 
|-id=378 bgcolor=#fefefe
| 607378 ||  || — || September 11, 2010 || Mount Lemmon || Mount Lemmon Survey ||  || align=right data-sort-value="0.54" | 540 m || 
|-id=379 bgcolor=#d6d6d6
| 607379 ||  || — || June 4, 2014 || Haleakala || Pan-STARRS ||  || align=right | 2.9 km || 
|-id=380 bgcolor=#d6d6d6
| 607380 ||  || — || August 9, 2004 || Siding Spring || SSS ||  || align=right | 3.2 km || 
|-id=381 bgcolor=#d6d6d6
| 607381 ||  || — || January 16, 2018 || Haleakala || Pan-STARRS ||  || align=right | 2.4 km || 
|-id=382 bgcolor=#E9E9E9
| 607382 ||  || — || November 17, 2004 || Siding Spring || SSS ||  || align=right data-sort-value="0.76" | 760 m || 
|-id=383 bgcolor=#E9E9E9
| 607383 ||  || — || August 2, 2016 || Haleakala || Pan-STARRS ||  || align=right data-sort-value="0.87" | 870 m || 
|-id=384 bgcolor=#fefefe
| 607384 ||  || — || October 15, 2014 || Kitt Peak || Spacewatch ||  || align=right data-sort-value="0.60" | 600 m || 
|-id=385 bgcolor=#d6d6d6
| 607385 ||  || — || December 1, 2000 || Kitt Peak || Spacewatch ||  || align=right | 2.2 km || 
|-id=386 bgcolor=#d6d6d6
| 607386 ||  || — || December 21, 2000 || Kitt Peak || Spacewatch ||  || align=right | 2.9 km || 
|-id=387 bgcolor=#d6d6d6
| 607387 ||  || — || December 28, 2000 || Kitt Peak || Spacewatch ||  || align=right | 2.3 km || 
|-id=388 bgcolor=#d6d6d6
| 607388 ||  || — || December 21, 2000 || Kitt Peak || Spacewatch ||  || align=right | 2.1 km || 
|-id=389 bgcolor=#E9E9E9
| 607389 ||  || — || December 29, 2000 || Kitt Peak || Spacewatch ||  || align=right data-sort-value="0.78" | 780 m || 
|-id=390 bgcolor=#E9E9E9
| 607390 ||  || — || December 20, 2000 || Kitt Peak || A. C. Becker, D. Wittman ||  || align=right | 1.3 km || 
|-id=391 bgcolor=#d6d6d6
| 607391 ||  || — || April 8, 2002 || Kitt Peak || Spacewatch ||  || align=right | 2.7 km || 
|-id=392 bgcolor=#E9E9E9
| 607392 ||  || — || September 26, 2003 || Palomar || NEAT ||  || align=right | 1.8 km || 
|-id=393 bgcolor=#E9E9E9
| 607393 ||  || — || January 10, 2014 || Kitt Peak || Spacewatch ||  || align=right | 1.3 km || 
|-id=394 bgcolor=#E9E9E9
| 607394 ||  || — || January 4, 2014 || Haleakala || Pan-STARRS ||  || align=right | 1.3 km || 
|-id=395 bgcolor=#d6d6d6
| 607395 ||  || — || December 12, 2015 || Haleakala || Pan-STARRS ||  || align=right | 2.4 km || 
|-id=396 bgcolor=#d6d6d6
| 607396 ||  || — || October 1, 2013 || Kitt Peak || Spacewatch || 7:4 || align=right | 3.4 km || 
|-id=397 bgcolor=#d6d6d6
| 607397 ||  || — || December 12, 2015 || Haleakala || Pan-STARRS ||  || align=right | 2.7 km || 
|-id=398 bgcolor=#E9E9E9
| 607398 ||  || — || September 8, 2016 || Haleakala || Pan-STARRS ||  || align=right | 1.5 km || 
|-id=399 bgcolor=#d6d6d6
| 607399 ||  || — || November 25, 2016 || Mount Lemmon || Mount Lemmon Survey ||  || align=right | 2.3 km || 
|-id=400 bgcolor=#fefefe
| 607400 ||  || — || January 21, 2012 || Kitt Peak || Spacewatch ||  || align=right data-sort-value="0.65" | 650 m || 
|}

607401–607500 

|-bgcolor=#d6d6d6
| 607401 ||  || — || July 30, 2014 || Haleakala || Pan-STARRS ||  || align=right | 2.2 km || 
|-id=402 bgcolor=#E9E9E9
| 607402 ||  || — || December 21, 2000 || Kitt Peak || Spacewatch ||  || align=right data-sort-value="0.98" | 980 m || 
|-id=403 bgcolor=#fefefe
| 607403 ||  || — || January 19, 2012 || Haleakala || Pan-STARRS ||  || align=right data-sort-value="0.64" | 640 m || 
|-id=404 bgcolor=#d6d6d6
| 607404 ||  || — || December 6, 2011 || Haleakala || Pan-STARRS ||  || align=right | 3.6 km || 
|-id=405 bgcolor=#E9E9E9
| 607405 ||  || — || January 17, 2001 || Socorro || LINEAR ||  || align=right | 1.8 km || 
|-id=406 bgcolor=#E9E9E9
| 607406 ||  || — || January 19, 2001 || Kitt Peak || Spacewatch ||  || align=right | 1.3 km || 
|-id=407 bgcolor=#E9E9E9
| 607407 ||  || — || June 17, 2015 || Haleakala || Pan-STARRS ||  || align=right data-sort-value="0.95" | 950 m || 
|-id=408 bgcolor=#E9E9E9
| 607408 ||  || — || October 9, 2012 || Mount Lemmon || Mount Lemmon Survey ||  || align=right data-sort-value="0.77" | 770 m || 
|-id=409 bgcolor=#fefefe
| 607409 ||  || — || December 18, 2014 || Haleakala || Pan-STARRS ||  || align=right | 1.2 km || 
|-id=410 bgcolor=#d6d6d6
| 607410 ||  || — || January 10, 2006 || Mount Lemmon || Mount Lemmon Survey ||  || align=right | 2.5 km || 
|-id=411 bgcolor=#E9E9E9
| 607411 ||  || — || October 27, 2016 || Mount Lemmon || Mount Lemmon Survey ||  || align=right | 1.5 km || 
|-id=412 bgcolor=#E9E9E9
| 607412 ||  || — || February 2, 2001 || Kitt Peak || Spacewatch ||  || align=right data-sort-value="0.99" | 990 m || 
|-id=413 bgcolor=#d6d6d6
| 607413 ||  || — || January 27, 2012 || Mount Lemmon || Mount Lemmon Survey ||  || align=right | 2.5 km || 
|-id=414 bgcolor=#fefefe
| 607414 ||  || — || November 19, 2003 || Kitt Peak || Spacewatch ||  || align=right data-sort-value="0.70" | 700 m || 
|-id=415 bgcolor=#d6d6d6
| 607415 ||  || — || November 28, 2010 || Mount Lemmon || Mount Lemmon Survey ||  || align=right | 2.7 km || 
|-id=416 bgcolor=#E9E9E9
| 607416 ||  || — || September 11, 2007 || Kitt Peak || Spacewatch ||  || align=right | 1.3 km || 
|-id=417 bgcolor=#E9E9E9
| 607417 ||  || — || October 18, 2012 || Haleakala || Pan-STARRS ||  || align=right | 1.3 km || 
|-id=418 bgcolor=#E9E9E9
| 607418 ||  || — || October 16, 2003 || Kitt Peak || Spacewatch ||  || align=right | 1.5 km || 
|-id=419 bgcolor=#d6d6d6
| 607419 ||  || — || September 17, 2003 || Kitt Peak || Spacewatch ||  || align=right | 3.7 km || 
|-id=420 bgcolor=#fefefe
| 607420 ||  || — || January 11, 2008 || Kitt Peak || Spacewatch ||  || align=right data-sort-value="0.69" | 690 m || 
|-id=421 bgcolor=#d6d6d6
| 607421 ||  || — || January 16, 2011 || Mount Lemmon || Mount Lemmon Survey ||  || align=right | 2.7 km || 
|-id=422 bgcolor=#E9E9E9
| 607422 ||  || — || March 28, 2014 || Catalina || CSS ||  || align=right | 1.6 km || 
|-id=423 bgcolor=#d6d6d6
| 607423 ||  || — || February 21, 2012 || Mount Lemmon || Mount Lemmon Survey ||  || align=right | 2.0 km || 
|-id=424 bgcolor=#E9E9E9
| 607424 ||  || — || March 11, 2005 || Mount Lemmon || Mount Lemmon Survey ||  || align=right | 1.4 km || 
|-id=425 bgcolor=#fefefe
| 607425 ||  || — || February 26, 2012 || Kitt Peak || Spacewatch ||  || align=right data-sort-value="0.59" | 590 m || 
|-id=426 bgcolor=#d6d6d6
| 607426 ||  || — || August 30, 2014 || Mount Lemmon || Mount Lemmon Survey ||  || align=right | 2.4 km || 
|-id=427 bgcolor=#d6d6d6
| 607427 ||  || — || July 25, 2014 || Haleakala || Pan-STARRS ||  || align=right | 2.5 km || 
|-id=428 bgcolor=#E9E9E9
| 607428 ||  || — || October 22, 2012 || Haleakala || Pan-STARRS ||  || align=right | 1.1 km || 
|-id=429 bgcolor=#E9E9E9
| 607429 ||  || — || October 5, 2016 || Mount Lemmon || Mount Lemmon Survey ||  || align=right | 1.4 km || 
|-id=430 bgcolor=#d6d6d6
| 607430 ||  || — || December 12, 2015 || Haleakala || Pan-STARRS ||  || align=right | 1.9 km || 
|-id=431 bgcolor=#d6d6d6
| 607431 ||  || — || December 6, 2015 || Mount Lemmon || R. A. Kowalski ||  || align=right | 2.7 km || 
|-id=432 bgcolor=#fefefe
| 607432 ||  || — || June 13, 2015 || Mount Lemmon || Mount Lemmon Survey || H || align=right data-sort-value="0.50" | 500 m || 
|-id=433 bgcolor=#d6d6d6
| 607433 ||  || — || January 28, 2017 || Haleakala || Pan-STARRS ||  || align=right | 2.6 km || 
|-id=434 bgcolor=#fefefe
| 607434 ||  || — || January 12, 2008 || Mount Lemmon || Mount Lemmon Survey ||  || align=right data-sort-value="0.55" | 550 m || 
|-id=435 bgcolor=#fefefe
| 607435 ||  || — || October 2, 2006 || Mount Lemmon || Mount Lemmon Survey ||  || align=right data-sort-value="0.69" | 690 m || 
|-id=436 bgcolor=#E9E9E9
| 607436 ||  || — || January 10, 2014 || Mount Lemmon || Mount Lemmon Survey ||  || align=right | 1.4 km || 
|-id=437 bgcolor=#d6d6d6
| 607437 ||  || — || September 19, 2003 || Kitt Peak || Spacewatch ||  || align=right | 2.2 km || 
|-id=438 bgcolor=#fefefe
| 607438 ||  || — || May 14, 2005 || Mount Lemmon || Mount Lemmon Survey ||  || align=right data-sort-value="0.75" | 750 m || 
|-id=439 bgcolor=#d6d6d6
| 607439 ||  || — || May 19, 2018 || Haleakala || Pan-STARRS ||  || align=right | 2.2 km || 
|-id=440 bgcolor=#d6d6d6
| 607440 ||  || — || March 17, 2001 || Kitt Peak || Spacewatch ||  || align=right | 1.7 km || 
|-id=441 bgcolor=#d6d6d6
| 607441 ||  || — || November 3, 2015 || Mount Lemmon || Mount Lemmon Survey ||  || align=right | 1.9 km || 
|-id=442 bgcolor=#E9E9E9
| 607442 ||  || — || March 16, 2001 || Kitt Peak || Spacewatch ||  || align=right | 1.5 km || 
|-id=443 bgcolor=#fefefe
| 607443 ||  || — || March 19, 2001 || Kanab || E. E. Sheridan ||  || align=right data-sort-value="0.98" | 980 m || 
|-id=444 bgcolor=#E9E9E9
| 607444 ||  || — || March 19, 2001 || Haleakala || AMOS ||  || align=right | 2.3 km || 
|-id=445 bgcolor=#d6d6d6
| 607445 ||  || — || March 26, 2001 || Kitt Peak || Spacewatch ||  || align=right | 2.7 km || 
|-id=446 bgcolor=#E9E9E9
| 607446 ||  || — || March 18, 2001 || Socorro || LINEAR ||  || align=right | 1.8 km || 
|-id=447 bgcolor=#fefefe
| 607447 ||  || — || March 20, 2001 || Haleakala || AMOS ||  || align=right data-sort-value="0.59" | 590 m || 
|-id=448 bgcolor=#E9E9E9
| 607448 ||  || — || March 21, 2001 || Anderson Mesa || LONEOS ||  || align=right | 1.2 km || 
|-id=449 bgcolor=#d6d6d6
| 607449 ||  || — || February 25, 2001 || Haleakala || AMOS ||  || align=right | 3.5 km || 
|-id=450 bgcolor=#E9E9E9
| 607450 ||  || — || March 21, 2001 || Kitt Peak || Spacewatch ||  || align=right | 1.1 km || 
|-id=451 bgcolor=#d6d6d6
| 607451 ||  || — || March 26, 2001 || Kitt Peak || Spacewatch ||  || align=right | 3.5 km || 
|-id=452 bgcolor=#E9E9E9
| 607452 ||  || — || March 16, 2001 || Kitt Peak || Spacewatch ||  || align=right | 1.0 km || 
|-id=453 bgcolor=#fefefe
| 607453 ||  || — || March 5, 2008 || Mount Lemmon || Mount Lemmon Survey ||  || align=right data-sort-value="0.58" | 580 m || 
|-id=454 bgcolor=#E9E9E9
| 607454 ||  || — || September 10, 2007 || Mount Lemmon || Mount Lemmon Survey ||  || align=right | 1.2 km || 
|-id=455 bgcolor=#E9E9E9
| 607455 ||  || — || March 21, 2001 || Kitt Peak || Kitt Peak Obs. ||  || align=right | 1.5 km || 
|-id=456 bgcolor=#fefefe
| 607456 ||  || — || March 21, 2001 || Kitt Peak || Kitt Peak Obs. ||  || align=right data-sort-value="0.58" | 580 m || 
|-id=457 bgcolor=#d6d6d6
| 607457 ||  || — || August 25, 2003 || Cerro Tololo || Cerro Tololo Obs. ||  || align=right | 2.0 km || 
|-id=458 bgcolor=#d6d6d6
| 607458 ||  || — || March 21, 2001 || Kitt Peak || Spacewatch ||  || align=right | 2.8 km || 
|-id=459 bgcolor=#fefefe
| 607459 ||  || — || March 21, 2001 || Kitt Peak || Spacewatch ||  || align=right data-sort-value="0.56" | 560 m || 
|-id=460 bgcolor=#E9E9E9
| 607460 ||  || — || March 21, 2001 || Kitt Peak || Spacewatch ||  || align=right | 1.4 km || 
|-id=461 bgcolor=#fefefe
| 607461 ||  || — || February 26, 2008 || Mount Lemmon || Mount Lemmon Survey ||  || align=right data-sort-value="0.56" | 560 m || 
|-id=462 bgcolor=#fefefe
| 607462 ||  || — || March 20, 2001 || Kitt Peak || Spacewatch ||  || align=right data-sort-value="0.64" | 640 m || 
|-id=463 bgcolor=#fefefe
| 607463 ||  || — || August 28, 2006 || Catalina || CSS ||  || align=right data-sort-value="0.70" | 700 m || 
|-id=464 bgcolor=#d6d6d6
| 607464 ||  || — || March 21, 2001 || Kitt Peak || Spacewatch ||  || align=right | 2.8 km || 
|-id=465 bgcolor=#d6d6d6
| 607465 ||  || — || August 24, 2003 || Cerro Tololo || Cerro Tololo Obs. ||  || align=right | 1.8 km || 
|-id=466 bgcolor=#E9E9E9
| 607466 ||  || — || March 11, 2005 || Mount Lemmon || Mount Lemmon Survey ||  || align=right | 1.1 km || 
|-id=467 bgcolor=#E9E9E9
| 607467 ||  || — || October 23, 2003 || Kitt Peak || L. H. Wasserman, D. E. Trilling ||  || align=right data-sort-value="0.82" | 820 m || 
|-id=468 bgcolor=#d6d6d6
| 607468 ||  || — || October 16, 2009 || Mount Lemmon || Mount Lemmon Survey ||  || align=right | 2.6 km || 
|-id=469 bgcolor=#fefefe
| 607469 ||  || — || October 23, 2006 || Kitt Peak || Spacewatch ||  || align=right data-sort-value="0.67" | 670 m || 
|-id=470 bgcolor=#fefefe
| 607470 ||  || — || March 22, 2001 || Kitt Peak || Kitt Peak Obs. ||  || align=right data-sort-value="0.45" | 450 m || 
|-id=471 bgcolor=#E9E9E9
| 607471 ||  || — || January 20, 2009 || Mount Lemmon || Mount Lemmon Survey ||  || align=right | 1.1 km || 
|-id=472 bgcolor=#E9E9E9
| 607472 ||  || — || December 30, 2008 || Kitt Peak || Spacewatch ||  || align=right | 1.1 km || 
|-id=473 bgcolor=#d6d6d6
| 607473 ||  || — || August 15, 2009 || Kitt Peak || Spacewatch ||  || align=right | 2.0 km || 
|-id=474 bgcolor=#d6d6d6
| 607474 ||  || — || September 16, 2003 || Kitt Peak || Spacewatch ||  || align=right | 2.4 km || 
|-id=475 bgcolor=#d6d6d6
| 607475 ||  || — || November 17, 2009 || Mount Lemmon || Mount Lemmon Survey ||  || align=right | 2.7 km || 
|-id=476 bgcolor=#fefefe
| 607476 ||  || — || March 29, 2001 || Haleakala || AMOS ||  || align=right data-sort-value="0.97" | 970 m || 
|-id=477 bgcolor=#fefefe
| 607477 ||  || — || February 9, 2008 || Mount Lemmon || Mount Lemmon Survey ||  || align=right data-sort-value="0.88" | 880 m || 
|-id=478 bgcolor=#E9E9E9
| 607478 ||  || — || February 10, 2014 || Haleakala || Pan-STARRS ||  || align=right | 2.4 km || 
|-id=479 bgcolor=#E9E9E9
| 607479 ||  || — || June 17, 2015 || Haleakala || Pan-STARRS ||  || align=right | 1.3 km || 
|-id=480 bgcolor=#E9E9E9
| 607480 ||  || — || November 19, 2003 || Kitt Peak || Spacewatch ||  || align=right | 1.7 km || 
|-id=481 bgcolor=#d6d6d6
| 607481 ||  || — || March 31, 2001 || Kitt Peak || Spacewatch ||  || align=right | 2.7 km || 
|-id=482 bgcolor=#fefefe
| 607482 ||  || — || February 28, 2008 || Mount Lemmon || Mount Lemmon Survey ||  || align=right data-sort-value="0.77" | 770 m || 
|-id=483 bgcolor=#E9E9E9
| 607483 ||  || — || April 1, 2014 || Kitt Peak || Spacewatch ||  || align=right data-sort-value="0.87" | 870 m || 
|-id=484 bgcolor=#d6d6d6
| 607484 ||  || — || March 18, 2007 || Kitt Peak || Spacewatch ||  || align=right | 2.4 km || 
|-id=485 bgcolor=#fefefe
| 607485 ||  || — || February 27, 2012 || Haleakala || Pan-STARRS ||  || align=right data-sort-value="0.49" | 490 m || 
|-id=486 bgcolor=#E9E9E9
| 607486 ||  || — || October 10, 2012 || Mount Lemmon || Mount Lemmon Survey ||  || align=right | 1.3 km || 
|-id=487 bgcolor=#d6d6d6
| 607487 ||  || — || March 24, 2001 || Kitt Peak || Spacewatch ||  || align=right | 2.2 km || 
|-id=488 bgcolor=#fefefe
| 607488 ||  || — || April 15, 2001 || Kitt Peak || Spacewatch ||  || align=right data-sort-value="0.48" | 480 m || 
|-id=489 bgcolor=#fefefe
| 607489 ||  || — || April 26, 2001 || Kitt Peak || Spacewatch ||  || align=right data-sort-value="0.88" | 880 m || 
|-id=490 bgcolor=#E9E9E9
| 607490 ||  || — || April 26, 2001 || Kitt Peak || Spacewatch ||  || align=right | 1.6 km || 
|-id=491 bgcolor=#d6d6d6
| 607491 ||  || — || October 24, 2009 || Mount Lemmon || Mount Lemmon Survey ||  || align=right | 3.6 km || 
|-id=492 bgcolor=#E9E9E9
| 607492 ||  || — || September 25, 2012 || Mount Lemmon || Mount Lemmon Survey ||  || align=right | 1.5 km || 
|-id=493 bgcolor=#d6d6d6
| 607493 ||  || — || April 20, 2007 || Kitt Peak || Spacewatch ||  || align=right | 2.9 km || 
|-id=494 bgcolor=#E9E9E9
| 607494 ||  || — || March 1, 2005 || Kitt Peak || Spacewatch ||  || align=right | 1.5 km || 
|-id=495 bgcolor=#E9E9E9
| 607495 ||  || — || November 20, 2003 || Kitt Peak || Spacewatch ||  || align=right | 1.4 km || 
|-id=496 bgcolor=#d6d6d6
| 607496 ||  || — || October 2, 2003 || Kitt Peak || Spacewatch ||  || align=right | 2.7 km || 
|-id=497 bgcolor=#fefefe
| 607497 ||  || — || October 19, 2006 || Mount Lemmon || Mount Lemmon Survey ||  || align=right data-sort-value="0.55" | 550 m || 
|-id=498 bgcolor=#fefefe
| 607498 ||  || — || August 15, 2009 || Kitt Peak || Spacewatch ||  || align=right data-sort-value="0.61" | 610 m || 
|-id=499 bgcolor=#E9E9E9
| 607499 ||  || — || December 24, 2017 || Haleakala || Pan-STARRS ||  || align=right | 1.6 km || 
|-id=500 bgcolor=#E9E9E9
| 607500 ||  || — || February 9, 2005 || Kitt Peak || Spacewatch ||  || align=right | 1.6 km || 
|}

607501–607600 

|-bgcolor=#fefefe
| 607501 ||  || — || May 22, 2001 || Anderson Mesa || LONEOS ||  || align=right | 1.2 km || 
|-id=502 bgcolor=#d6d6d6
| 607502 ||  || — || May 24, 2001 || Socorro || LINEAR ||  || align=right | 3.6 km || 
|-id=503 bgcolor=#d6d6d6
| 607503 ||  || — || April 27, 2001 || Socorro || LINEAR ||  || align=right | 4.0 km || 
|-id=504 bgcolor=#d6d6d6
| 607504 ||  || — || November 14, 2015 || Mount Lemmon || Mount Lemmon Survey ||  || align=right | 2.0 km || 
|-id=505 bgcolor=#fefefe
| 607505 ||  || — || February 28, 2008 || Kitt Peak || Spacewatch ||  || align=right data-sort-value="0.70" | 700 m || 
|-id=506 bgcolor=#E9E9E9
| 607506 ||  || — || December 22, 2003 || Kitt Peak || Spacewatch ||  || align=right | 2.3 km || 
|-id=507 bgcolor=#fefefe
| 607507 ||  || — || February 11, 2008 || Mount Lemmon || Mount Lemmon Survey ||  || align=right data-sort-value="0.76" | 760 m || 
|-id=508 bgcolor=#fefefe
| 607508 ||  || — || March 24, 2012 || Mount Lemmon || Mount Lemmon Survey ||  || align=right data-sort-value="0.79" | 790 m || 
|-id=509 bgcolor=#fefefe
| 607509 ||  || — || December 29, 2014 || Haleakala || Pan-STARRS ||  || align=right data-sort-value="0.88" | 880 m || 
|-id=510 bgcolor=#E9E9E9
| 607510 ||  || — || October 10, 2007 || Mount Lemmon || Mount Lemmon Survey ||  || align=right | 1.7 km || 
|-id=511 bgcolor=#d6d6d6
| 607511 ||  || — || March 13, 2012 || Kitt Peak || Spacewatch ||  || align=right | 2.1 km || 
|-id=512 bgcolor=#d6d6d6
| 607512 ||  || — || March 16, 2012 || Mount Lemmon || Mount Lemmon Survey ||  || align=right | 2.8 km || 
|-id=513 bgcolor=#d6d6d6
| 607513 ||  || — || April 27, 2012 || Haleakala || Pan-STARRS ||  || align=right | 2.5 km || 
|-id=514 bgcolor=#fefefe
| 607514 ||  || — || August 13, 2012 || Haleakala || Pan-STARRS ||  || align=right data-sort-value="0.80" | 800 m || 
|-id=515 bgcolor=#d6d6d6
| 607515 ||  || — || August 23, 2014 || Haleakala || Pan-STARRS ||  || align=right | 2.5 km || 
|-id=516 bgcolor=#fefefe
| 607516 ||  || — || April 10, 2008 || Catalina || CSS ||  || align=right data-sort-value="0.88" | 880 m || 
|-id=517 bgcolor=#E9E9E9
| 607517 ||  || — || April 11, 2005 || Mount Lemmon || Mount Lemmon Survey ||  || align=right | 1.1 km || 
|-id=518 bgcolor=#E9E9E9
| 607518 ||  || — || September 18, 2011 || Mount Lemmon || Mount Lemmon Survey ||  || align=right | 1.6 km || 
|-id=519 bgcolor=#E9E9E9
| 607519 ||  || — || November 2, 2016 || Mount Lemmon || Mount Lemmon Survey ||  || align=right | 1.8 km || 
|-id=520 bgcolor=#d6d6d6
| 607520 ||  || — || September 28, 2014 || Haleakala || Pan-STARRS ||  || align=right | 2.6 km || 
|-id=521 bgcolor=#d6d6d6
| 607521 ||  || — || October 3, 2014 || Kitt Peak || Spacewatch ||  || align=right | 2.6 km || 
|-id=522 bgcolor=#fefefe
| 607522 ||  || — || April 21, 2012 || Haleakala || Pan-STARRS ||  || align=right data-sort-value="0.81" | 810 m || 
|-id=523 bgcolor=#fefefe
| 607523 ||  || — || August 9, 2013 || Kitt Peak || Spacewatch ||  || align=right data-sort-value="0.56" | 560 m || 
|-id=524 bgcolor=#fefefe
| 607524 ||  || — || April 12, 2012 || Haleakala || Pan-STARRS ||  || align=right data-sort-value="0.73" | 730 m || 
|-id=525 bgcolor=#E9E9E9
| 607525 ||  || — || October 8, 2007 || Mount Lemmon || Mount Lemmon Survey ||  || align=right | 1.6 km || 
|-id=526 bgcolor=#d6d6d6
| 607526 ||  || — || November 24, 2009 || Kitt Peak || Spacewatch ||  || align=right | 2.2 km || 
|-id=527 bgcolor=#fefefe
| 607527 ||  || — || May 22, 2001 || Cerro Tololo || J. L. Elliot, L. H. Wasserman ||  || align=right data-sort-value="0.83" | 830 m || 
|-id=528 bgcolor=#E9E9E9
| 607528 ||  || — || June 27, 2014 || Haleakala || Pan-STARRS ||  || align=right | 2.2 km || 
|-id=529 bgcolor=#E9E9E9
| 607529 ||  || — || November 8, 2007 || Mount Lemmon || Mount Lemmon Survey ||  || align=right | 2.2 km || 
|-id=530 bgcolor=#fefefe
| 607530 ||  || — || July 14, 2001 || Palomar || NEAT ||  || align=right data-sort-value="0.63" | 630 m || 
|-id=531 bgcolor=#fefefe
| 607531 ||  || — || April 28, 2004 || Kitt Peak || Spacewatch ||  || align=right data-sort-value="0.62" | 620 m || 
|-id=532 bgcolor=#fefefe
| 607532 ||  || — || January 28, 2011 || Mount Lemmon || Mount Lemmon Survey ||  || align=right data-sort-value="0.90" | 900 m || 
|-id=533 bgcolor=#E9E9E9
| 607533 ||  || — || June 17, 2015 || Haleakala || Pan-STARRS ||  || align=right | 2.2 km || 
|-id=534 bgcolor=#fefefe
| 607534 ||  || — || August 9, 2001 || Palomar || NEAT ||  || align=right data-sort-value="0.72" | 720 m || 
|-id=535 bgcolor=#fefefe
| 607535 ||  || — || August 10, 2001 || Palomar || NEAT ||  || align=right data-sort-value="0.71" | 710 m || 
|-id=536 bgcolor=#fefefe
| 607536 ||  || — || August 15, 2001 || Haleakala || AMOS ||  || align=right data-sort-value="0.87" | 870 m || 
|-id=537 bgcolor=#fefefe
| 607537 ||  || — || August 14, 2001 || Haleakala || AMOS ||  || align=right data-sort-value="0.67" | 670 m || 
|-id=538 bgcolor=#FA8072
| 607538 ||  || — || July 11, 2001 || Palomar || NEAT ||  || align=right data-sort-value="0.75" | 750 m || 
|-id=539 bgcolor=#E9E9E9
| 607539 ||  || — || August 20, 2001 || Palomar || NEAT ||  || align=right | 4.5 km || 
|-id=540 bgcolor=#fefefe
| 607540 ||  || — || August 24, 2001 || Haleakala || AMOS ||  || align=right data-sort-value="0.64" | 640 m || 
|-id=541 bgcolor=#fefefe
| 607541 ||  || — || August 23, 2001 || Kitt Peak || Spacewatch ||  || align=right data-sort-value="0.66" | 660 m || 
|-id=542 bgcolor=#E9E9E9
| 607542 ||  || — || September 19, 2001 || Kitt Peak || Spacewatch ||  || align=right | 1.7 km || 
|-id=543 bgcolor=#d6d6d6
| 607543 ||  || — || August 20, 2001 || Cerro Tololo || Cerro Tololo Obs. ||  || align=right | 1.8 km || 
|-id=544 bgcolor=#d6d6d6
| 607544 ||  || — || September 23, 2011 || Haleakala || Pan-STARRS ||  || align=right | 1.7 km || 
|-id=545 bgcolor=#fefefe
| 607545 ||  || — || January 11, 2011 || Kitt Peak || Spacewatch ||  || align=right data-sort-value="0.67" | 670 m || 
|-id=546 bgcolor=#d6d6d6
| 607546 ||  || — || October 5, 2014 || Haleakala || Pan-STARRS || 7:4 || align=right | 3.4 km || 
|-id=547 bgcolor=#E9E9E9
| 607547 ||  || — || August 27, 2001 || Kitt Peak || Spacewatch ||  || align=right | 1.1 km || 
|-id=548 bgcolor=#fefefe
| 607548 ||  || — || October 21, 2017 || Mount Lemmon || Mount Lemmon Survey ||  || align=right data-sort-value="0.86" | 860 m || 
|-id=549 bgcolor=#E9E9E9
| 607549 ||  || — || September 12, 2001 || Socorro || LINEAR ||  || align=right | 1.9 km || 
|-id=550 bgcolor=#d6d6d6
| 607550 ||  || — || September 12, 2001 || Socorro || LINEAR ||  || align=right | 2.3 km || 
|-id=551 bgcolor=#d6d6d6
| 607551 ||  || — || September 12, 2001 || Kitt Peak || Spacewatch ||  || align=right | 2.0 km || 
|-id=552 bgcolor=#E9E9E9
| 607552 ||  || — || August 16, 2001 || Socorro || LINEAR ||  || align=right | 2.4 km || 
|-id=553 bgcolor=#fefefe
| 607553 ||  || — || August 27, 2001 || Kitt Peak || Spacewatch ||  || align=right data-sort-value="0.91" | 910 m || 
|-id=554 bgcolor=#fefefe
| 607554 ||  || — || September 20, 2001 || Socorro || LINEAR ||  || align=right data-sort-value="0.64" | 640 m || 
|-id=555 bgcolor=#d6d6d6
| 607555 ||  || — || September 16, 2001 || Socorro || LINEAR ||  || align=right | 2.6 km || 
|-id=556 bgcolor=#fefefe
| 607556 ||  || — || September 19, 2001 || Socorro || LINEAR ||  || align=right data-sort-value="0.71" | 710 m || 
|-id=557 bgcolor=#E9E9E9
| 607557 ||  || — || September 20, 2001 || Socorro || LINEAR ||  || align=right | 2.3 km || 
|-id=558 bgcolor=#fefefe
| 607558 ||  || — || September 21, 2001 || Socorro || LINEAR ||  || align=right data-sort-value="0.56" | 560 m || 
|-id=559 bgcolor=#fefefe
| 607559 ||  || — || September 18, 2001 || Kitt Peak || Spacewatch ||  || align=right data-sort-value="0.48" | 480 m || 
|-id=560 bgcolor=#d6d6d6
| 607560 ||  || — || August 24, 2001 || Kitt Peak || Spacewatch ||  || align=right | 1.9 km || 
|-id=561 bgcolor=#fefefe
| 607561 ||  || — || September 26, 2005 || Kitt Peak || Spacewatch ||  || align=right data-sort-value="0.61" | 610 m || 
|-id=562 bgcolor=#fefefe
| 607562 ||  || — || October 1, 2005 || Kitt Peak || Spacewatch ||  || align=right data-sort-value="0.93" | 930 m || 
|-id=563 bgcolor=#fefefe
| 607563 ||  || — || September 18, 2001 || Apache Point || SDSS Collaboration ||  || align=right data-sort-value="0.74" | 740 m || 
|-id=564 bgcolor=#fefefe
| 607564 ||  || — || August 28, 2014 || Haleakala || Pan-STARRS ||  || align=right data-sort-value="0.59" | 590 m || 
|-id=565 bgcolor=#d6d6d6
| 607565 ||  || — || September 28, 2001 || Palomar || NEAT ||  || align=right | 2.3 km || 
|-id=566 bgcolor=#E9E9E9
| 607566 ||  || — || August 7, 2013 || Kitt Peak || Spacewatch ||  || align=right data-sort-value="0.77" | 770 m || 
|-id=567 bgcolor=#fefefe
| 607567 ||  || — || October 23, 2001 || Kitt Peak || Spacewatch || H || align=right data-sort-value="0.43" | 430 m || 
|-id=568 bgcolor=#d6d6d6
| 607568 ||  || — || September 2, 2013 || Mount Lemmon || Mount Lemmon Survey ||  || align=right | 2.5 km || 
|-id=569 bgcolor=#fefefe
| 607569 ||  || — || October 7, 2001 || Palomar || NEAT ||  || align=right data-sort-value="0.64" | 640 m || 
|-id=570 bgcolor=#fefefe
| 607570 ||  || — || May 24, 2001 || Cerro Tololo || J. L. Elliot, L. H. Wasserman ||  || align=right data-sort-value="0.63" | 630 m || 
|-id=571 bgcolor=#E9E9E9
| 607571 ||  || — || October 3, 2006 || Mount Lemmon || Mount Lemmon Survey ||  || align=right | 3.2 km || 
|-id=572 bgcolor=#fefefe
| 607572 ||  || — || March 15, 2007 || Kitt Peak || Spacewatch || V || align=right data-sort-value="0.67" | 670 m || 
|-id=573 bgcolor=#fefefe
| 607573 ||  || — || April 1, 2008 || Mount Lemmon || Mount Lemmon Survey ||  || align=right | 1.0 km || 
|-id=574 bgcolor=#d6d6d6
| 607574 ||  || — || September 18, 2006 || Kitt Peak || Spacewatch ||  || align=right | 1.8 km || 
|-id=575 bgcolor=#d6d6d6
| 607575 ||  || — || August 9, 2013 || Kitt Peak || Spacewatch || 7:4 || align=right | 2.6 km || 
|-id=576 bgcolor=#fefefe
| 607576 ||  || — || April 15, 2007 || Kitt Peak || Spacewatch ||  || align=right data-sort-value="0.49" | 490 m || 
|-id=577 bgcolor=#fefefe
| 607577 ||  || — || October 11, 2005 || Kitt Peak || Spacewatch ||  || align=right data-sort-value="0.68" | 680 m || 
|-id=578 bgcolor=#d6d6d6
| 607578 ||  || — || September 20, 2001 || Socorro || LINEAR ||  || align=right | 2.5 km || 
|-id=579 bgcolor=#d6d6d6
| 607579 ||  || — || October 20, 2001 || Socorro || LINEAR ||  || align=right | 2.5 km || 
|-id=580 bgcolor=#E9E9E9
| 607580 ||  || — || October 24, 2001 || Kitt Peak || Spacewatch ||  || align=right | 2.3 km || 
|-id=581 bgcolor=#fefefe
| 607581 ||  || — || January 23, 2006 || Kitt Peak || Spacewatch ||  || align=right data-sort-value="0.55" | 550 m || 
|-id=582 bgcolor=#fefefe
| 607582 ||  || — || September 28, 2001 || Palomar || NEAT ||  || align=right data-sort-value="0.67" | 670 m || 
|-id=583 bgcolor=#fefefe
| 607583 ||  || — || July 13, 2016 || Mount Lemmon || Mount Lemmon Survey ||  || align=right data-sort-value="0.75" | 750 m || 
|-id=584 bgcolor=#fefefe
| 607584 ||  || — || March 26, 2003 || Kitt Peak || Spacewatch ||  || align=right data-sort-value="0.64" | 640 m || 
|-id=585 bgcolor=#d6d6d6
| 607585 ||  || — || October 23, 2006 || Kitt Peak || Spacewatch ||  || align=right | 1.9 km || 
|-id=586 bgcolor=#fefefe
| 607586 ||  || — || April 20, 2004 || Kitt Peak || Spacewatch ||  || align=right | 1.1 km || 
|-id=587 bgcolor=#fefefe
| 607587 ||  || — || October 18, 2001 || Kitt Peak || Spacewatch ||  || align=right data-sort-value="0.76" | 760 m || 
|-id=588 bgcolor=#fefefe
| 607588 ||  || — || September 21, 2011 || Kitt Peak || Spacewatch ||  || align=right data-sort-value="0.52" | 520 m || 
|-id=589 bgcolor=#E9E9E9
| 607589 ||  || — || November 27, 2006 || Kitt Peak || Spacewatch ||  || align=right | 1.5 km || 
|-id=590 bgcolor=#fefefe
| 607590 ||  || — || October 29, 2005 || Kitt Peak || Spacewatch ||  || align=right data-sort-value="0.81" | 810 m || 
|-id=591 bgcolor=#d6d6d6
| 607591 ||  || — || October 31, 2006 || Mount Lemmon || Mount Lemmon Survey ||  || align=right | 1.8 km || 
|-id=592 bgcolor=#d6d6d6
| 607592 ||  || — || April 25, 2014 || Mount Lemmon || Mount Lemmon Survey ||  || align=right | 1.7 km || 
|-id=593 bgcolor=#d6d6d6
| 607593 ||  || — || October 21, 2001 || Socorro || LINEAR ||  || align=right | 2.0 km || 
|-id=594 bgcolor=#fefefe
| 607594 ||  || — || November 12, 2001 || Socorro || LINEAR ||  || align=right data-sort-value="0.94" | 940 m || 
|-id=595 bgcolor=#E9E9E9
| 607595 ||  || — || February 29, 2004 || Kitt Peak || Spacewatch ||  || align=right | 2.5 km || 
|-id=596 bgcolor=#d6d6d6
| 607596 ||  || — || March 13, 2013 || Kitt Peak || Spacewatch ||  || align=right | 1.9 km || 
|-id=597 bgcolor=#d6d6d6
| 607597 ||  || — || October 4, 2006 || Mount Lemmon || Mount Lemmon Survey ||  || align=right | 2.5 km || 
|-id=598 bgcolor=#d6d6d6
| 607598 ||  || — || November 20, 2001 || Socorro || LINEAR ||  || align=right | 2.3 km || 
|-id=599 bgcolor=#E9E9E9
| 607599 ||  || — || December 9, 2005 || Socorro || LINEAR || EUN || align=right | 1.7 km || 
|-id=600 bgcolor=#E9E9E9
| 607600 ||  || — || October 25, 2005 || Mount Lemmon || Mount Lemmon Survey ||  || align=right | 1.2 km || 
|}

607601–607700 

|-bgcolor=#d6d6d6
| 607601 ||  || — || October 23, 2006 || Kitt Peak || Spacewatch ||  || align=right | 2.3 km || 
|-id=602 bgcolor=#fefefe
| 607602 ||  || — || November 3, 2005 || Mount Lemmon || Mount Lemmon Survey ||  || align=right | 1.0 km || 
|-id=603 bgcolor=#d6d6d6
| 607603 ||  || — || September 29, 2010 || Mount Lemmon || Mount Lemmon Survey ||  || align=right | 2.3 km || 
|-id=604 bgcolor=#E9E9E9
| 607604 ||  || — || December 9, 2001 || Socorro || LINEAR ||  || align=right | 1.1 km || 
|-id=605 bgcolor=#fefefe
| 607605 ||  || — || December 14, 2001 || Socorro || LINEAR ||  || align=right data-sort-value="0.81" | 810 m || 
|-id=606 bgcolor=#d6d6d6
| 607606 ||  || — || December 14, 2001 || Socorro || LINEAR ||  || align=right | 2.6 km || 
|-id=607 bgcolor=#fefefe
| 607607 ||  || — || December 8, 2001 || Anderson Mesa || LONEOS ||  || align=right | 1.1 km || 
|-id=608 bgcolor=#E9E9E9
| 607608 ||  || — || December 2, 2005 || Kitt Peak || Spacewatch ||  || align=right | 1.2 km || 
|-id=609 bgcolor=#E9E9E9
| 607609 ||  || — || July 16, 2004 || Siding Spring || SSS ||  || align=right | 1.5 km || 
|-id=610 bgcolor=#d6d6d6
| 607610 ||  || — || December 18, 2001 || Socorro || LINEAR ||  || align=right | 2.1 km || 
|-id=611 bgcolor=#E9E9E9
| 607611 ||  || — || December 18, 2001 || Socorro || LINEAR ||  || align=right | 1.5 km || 
|-id=612 bgcolor=#d6d6d6
| 607612 ||  || — || October 7, 2005 || Kitt Peak || Spacewatch || KOR || align=right | 1.1 km || 
|-id=613 bgcolor=#fefefe
| 607613 ||  || — || December 10, 2014 || Mount Lemmon || Mount Lemmon Survey ||  || align=right data-sort-value="0.63" | 630 m || 
|-id=614 bgcolor=#fefefe
| 607614 ||  || — || February 14, 2009 || Mount Lemmon || Mount Lemmon Survey ||  || align=right data-sort-value="0.51" | 510 m || 
|-id=615 bgcolor=#E9E9E9
| 607615 ||  || — || January 6, 2002 || Kitt Peak || Spacewatch ||  || align=right data-sort-value="0.97" | 970 m || 
|-id=616 bgcolor=#d6d6d6
| 607616 ||  || — || January 13, 2002 || Kitt Peak || Spacewatch ||  || align=right | 3.0 km || 
|-id=617 bgcolor=#E9E9E9
| 607617 ||  || — || January 13, 2002 || Socorro || LINEAR ||  || align=right data-sort-value="0.63" | 630 m || 
|-id=618 bgcolor=#E9E9E9
| 607618 ||  || — || January 13, 2002 || Socorro || LINEAR ||  || align=right | 1.0 km || 
|-id=619 bgcolor=#d6d6d6
| 607619 ||  || — || August 29, 2005 || Kitt Peak || Spacewatch ||  || align=right | 2.0 km || 
|-id=620 bgcolor=#fefefe
| 607620 ||  || — || January 7, 2002 || Kitt Peak || Spacewatch ||  || align=right data-sort-value="0.69" | 690 m || 
|-id=621 bgcolor=#fefefe
| 607621 ||  || — || April 13, 2013 || Haleakala || Pan-STARRS ||  || align=right data-sort-value="0.79" | 790 m || 
|-id=622 bgcolor=#fefefe
| 607622 ||  || — || September 23, 2014 || Mount Lemmon || Mount Lemmon Survey ||  || align=right data-sort-value="0.56" | 560 m || 
|-id=623 bgcolor=#fefefe
| 607623 ||  || — || January 19, 2012 || Haleakala || Pan-STARRS ||  || align=right data-sort-value="0.55" | 550 m || 
|-id=624 bgcolor=#fefefe
| 607624 ||  || — || January 18, 2012 || Kitt Peak || Spacewatch ||  || align=right data-sort-value="0.57" | 570 m || 
|-id=625 bgcolor=#d6d6d6
| 607625 ||  || — || March 13, 2013 || Mount Lemmon || Mount Lemmon Survey ||  || align=right | 2.1 km || 
|-id=626 bgcolor=#fefefe
| 607626 ||  || — || October 2, 2014 || Haleakala || Pan-STARRS ||  || align=right data-sort-value="0.54" | 540 m || 
|-id=627 bgcolor=#E9E9E9
| 607627 ||  || — || January 12, 2002 || Campo Imperatore || A. Boattini, F. Bernardi ||  || align=right data-sort-value="0.76" | 760 m || 
|-id=628 bgcolor=#E9E9E9
| 607628 ||  || — || January 21, 2002 || Kitt Peak || Spacewatch ||  || align=right | 1.4 km || 
|-id=629 bgcolor=#fefefe
| 607629 ||  || — || April 16, 2013 || Kitt Peak || Spacewatch ||  || align=right data-sort-value="0.84" | 840 m || 
|-id=630 bgcolor=#d6d6d6
| 607630 ||  || — || March 6, 2008 || Bergisch Gladbach || W. Bickel ||  || align=right | 2.3 km || 
|-id=631 bgcolor=#fefefe
| 607631 ||  || — || February 7, 2002 || Kitt Peak || Spacewatch || H || align=right data-sort-value="0.53" | 530 m || 
|-id=632 bgcolor=#fefefe
| 607632 ||  || — || February 7, 2002 || Palomar || NEAT ||  || align=right data-sort-value="0.90" | 900 m || 
|-id=633 bgcolor=#E9E9E9
| 607633 ||  || — || February 10, 2002 || Socorro || LINEAR ||  || align=right data-sort-value="0.73" | 730 m || 
|-id=634 bgcolor=#d6d6d6
| 607634 ||  || — || February 7, 2002 || Socorro || LINEAR ||  || align=right | 2.7 km || 
|-id=635 bgcolor=#d6d6d6
| 607635 ||  || — || February 13, 2002 || Kitt Peak || Spacewatch ||  || align=right | 1.8 km || 
|-id=636 bgcolor=#d6d6d6
| 607636 ||  || — || October 1, 2005 || Kitt Peak || Spacewatch ||  || align=right | 1.9 km || 
|-id=637 bgcolor=#E9E9E9
| 607637 ||  || — || February 10, 2002 || Socorro || LINEAR ||  || align=right | 1.4 km || 
|-id=638 bgcolor=#fefefe
| 607638 ||  || — || February 10, 2002 || Socorro || LINEAR || H || align=right data-sort-value="0.65" | 650 m || 
|-id=639 bgcolor=#E9E9E9
| 607639 ||  || — || February 6, 2002 || Anderson Mesa || LONEOS ||  || align=right | 1.1 km || 
|-id=640 bgcolor=#fefefe
| 607640 ||  || — || March 19, 2009 || Kitt Peak || Spacewatch ||  || align=right data-sort-value="0.76" | 760 m || 
|-id=641 bgcolor=#E9E9E9
| 607641 ||  || — || February 7, 2002 || Palomar || NEAT ||  || align=right | 1.7 km || 
|-id=642 bgcolor=#E9E9E9
| 607642 ||  || — || March 1, 2011 || Mount Lemmon || Mount Lemmon Survey ||  || align=right | 1.1 km || 
|-id=643 bgcolor=#E9E9E9
| 607643 ||  || — || August 8, 2016 || Haleakala || Pan-STARRS ||  || align=right data-sort-value="0.69" | 690 m || 
|-id=644 bgcolor=#E9E9E9
| 607644 ||  || — || November 4, 2013 || Haleakala || Pan-STARRS ||  || align=right data-sort-value="0.79" | 790 m || 
|-id=645 bgcolor=#E9E9E9
| 607645 ||  || — || November 7, 2005 || Mauna Kea || Mauna Kea Obs. ||  || align=right data-sort-value="0.99" | 990 m || 
|-id=646 bgcolor=#d6d6d6
| 607646 ||  || — || September 1, 2005 || Kitt Peak || Spacewatch ||  || align=right | 1.8 km || 
|-id=647 bgcolor=#d6d6d6
| 607647 ||  || — || November 27, 2010 || Mount Lemmon || Mount Lemmon Survey ||  || align=right | 1.9 km || 
|-id=648 bgcolor=#E9E9E9
| 607648 ||  || — || October 19, 2012 || Mount Lemmon || Mount Lemmon Survey ||  || align=right data-sort-value="0.85" | 850 m || 
|-id=649 bgcolor=#d6d6d6
| 607649 ||  || — || January 27, 2017 || Haleakala || Pan-STARRS ||  || align=right | 2.2 km || 
|-id=650 bgcolor=#fefefe
| 607650 ||  || — || February 23, 2007 || Kitt Peak || Spacewatch || H || align=right data-sort-value="0.43" | 430 m || 
|-id=651 bgcolor=#E9E9E9
| 607651 ||  || — || February 7, 2002 || Kitt Peak || Spacewatch ||  || align=right data-sort-value="0.80" | 800 m || 
|-id=652 bgcolor=#d6d6d6
| 607652 ||  || — || September 9, 2015 || Haleakala || Pan-STARRS ||  || align=right | 2.2 km || 
|-id=653 bgcolor=#C2FFFF
| 607653 ||  || — || February 8, 2002 || Kitt Peak || R. Millis, M. W. Buie || L4 || align=right | 6.2 km || 
|-id=654 bgcolor=#C2FFFF
| 607654 ||  || — || September 15, 2007 || Mount Lemmon || Mount Lemmon Survey || L4 || align=right | 5.8 km || 
|-id=655 bgcolor=#fefefe
| 607655 ||  || — || February 13, 2002 || Kitt Peak || Spacewatch ||  || align=right data-sort-value="0.49" | 490 m || 
|-id=656 bgcolor=#d6d6d6
| 607656 ||  || — || September 17, 2010 || Mount Lemmon || Mount Lemmon Survey ||  || align=right | 1.9 km || 
|-id=657 bgcolor=#C2FFFF
| 607657 ||  || — || January 21, 2015 || Haleakala || Pan-STARRS || L4 || align=right | 7.1 km || 
|-id=658 bgcolor=#fefefe
| 607658 ||  || — || November 17, 2014 || Haleakala || Pan-STARRS ||  || align=right data-sort-value="0.48" | 480 m || 
|-id=659 bgcolor=#d6d6d6
| 607659 ||  || — || February 8, 2002 || Kitt Peak || Spacewatch ||  || align=right | 2.1 km || 
|-id=660 bgcolor=#E9E9E9
| 607660 ||  || — || February 14, 2002 || Kitt Peak || Spacewatch ||  || align=right | 1.0 km || 
|-id=661 bgcolor=#d6d6d6
| 607661 ||  || — || February 13, 2002 || Apache Point || SDSS Collaboration ||  || align=right | 2.0 km || 
|-id=662 bgcolor=#fefefe
| 607662 ||  || — || January 29, 2012 || Kitt Peak || Spacewatch ||  || align=right data-sort-value="0.61" | 610 m || 
|-id=663 bgcolor=#E9E9E9
| 607663 ||  || — || March 10, 2002 || Kitt Peak || Spacewatch ||  || align=right data-sort-value="0.85" | 850 m || 
|-id=664 bgcolor=#E9E9E9
| 607664 ||  || — || February 14, 2002 || Kitt Peak || Spacewatch ||  || align=right | 1.0 km || 
|-id=665 bgcolor=#E9E9E9
| 607665 ||  || — || March 13, 2002 || Socorro || LINEAR ||  || align=right | 1.0 km || 
|-id=666 bgcolor=#E9E9E9
| 607666 ||  || — || February 7, 2002 || Kitt Peak || R. Millis, M. W. Buie ||  || align=right | 1.2 km || 
|-id=667 bgcolor=#d6d6d6
| 607667 ||  || — || March 15, 2002 || Palomar || NEAT ||  || align=right | 4.3 km || 
|-id=668 bgcolor=#C2FFFF
| 607668 ||  || — || April 5, 2003 || Kitt Peak || Spacewatch || L4(8060) || align=right | 7.1 km || 
|-id=669 bgcolor=#E9E9E9
| 607669 ||  || — || February 13, 2002 || Apache Point || SDSS Collaboration ||  || align=right | 1.3 km || 
|-id=670 bgcolor=#fefefe
| 607670 ||  || — || March 10, 2002 || Kitt Peak || Spacewatch ||  || align=right data-sort-value="0.74" | 740 m || 
|-id=671 bgcolor=#E9E9E9
| 607671 ||  || — || June 7, 2016 || Haleakala || Pan-STARRS ||  || align=right data-sort-value="0.76" | 760 m || 
|-id=672 bgcolor=#d6d6d6
| 607672 ||  || — || November 13, 2010 || Mount Lemmon || Mount Lemmon Survey ||  || align=right | 2.2 km || 
|-id=673 bgcolor=#d6d6d6
| 607673 ||  || — || November 2, 2010 || Mount Lemmon || Mount Lemmon Survey ||  || align=right | 2.2 km || 
|-id=674 bgcolor=#d6d6d6
| 607674 ||  || — || November 21, 2006 || Mount Lemmon || Mount Lemmon Survey ||  || align=right | 3.0 km || 
|-id=675 bgcolor=#d6d6d6
| 607675 ||  || — || January 22, 2012 || Haleakala || Pan-STARRS ||  || align=right | 2.2 km || 
|-id=676 bgcolor=#d6d6d6
| 607676 ||  || — || March 12, 2002 || Kitt Peak || Spacewatch ||  || align=right | 2.0 km || 
|-id=677 bgcolor=#E9E9E9
| 607677 ||  || — || April 12, 2002 || Palomar || NEAT ||  || align=right | 1.8 km || 
|-id=678 bgcolor=#d6d6d6
| 607678 ||  || — || March 13, 2002 || Kitt Peak || Spacewatch ||  || align=right | 2.9 km || 
|-id=679 bgcolor=#d6d6d6
| 607679 ||  || — || March 18, 2018 || Haleakala || Pan-STARRS ||  || align=right | 2.2 km || 
|-id=680 bgcolor=#fefefe
| 607680 ||  || — || August 12, 2013 || Haleakala || Pan-STARRS ||  || align=right data-sort-value="0.57" | 570 m || 
|-id=681 bgcolor=#E9E9E9
| 607681 ||  || — || September 29, 2008 || Catalina || CSS ||  || align=right | 1.1 km || 
|-id=682 bgcolor=#fefefe
| 607682 ||  || — || March 13, 2002 || Palomar || NEAT ||  || align=right data-sort-value="0.60" | 600 m || 
|-id=683 bgcolor=#d6d6d6
| 607683 ||  || — || March 9, 2002 || Kitt Peak || Spacewatch ||  || align=right | 2.0 km || 
|-id=684 bgcolor=#d6d6d6
| 607684 ||  || — || March 11, 2002 || Palomar || NEAT ||  || align=right | 3.8 km || 
|-id=685 bgcolor=#d6d6d6
| 607685 ||  || — || March 18, 2002 || Kitt Peak || M. W. Buie, D. E. Trilling ||  || align=right | 2.1 km || 
|-id=686 bgcolor=#E9E9E9
| 607686 ||  || — || March 18, 2002 || Kitt Peak || Spacewatch ||  || align=right | 1.0 km || 
|-id=687 bgcolor=#C2FFFF
| 607687 ||  || — || March 9, 2002 || Kitt Peak || Spacewatch || L4 || align=right | 7.1 km || 
|-id=688 bgcolor=#E9E9E9
| 607688 ||  || — || January 21, 2014 || Kitt Peak || Spacewatch ||  || align=right data-sort-value="0.70" | 700 m || 
|-id=689 bgcolor=#C2FFFF
| 607689 ||  || — || January 10, 2013 || Haleakala || Pan-STARRS || L4 || align=right | 6.2 km || 
|-id=690 bgcolor=#d6d6d6
| 607690 ||  || — || April 5, 2002 || Eskridge || G. Hug ||  || align=right | 3.0 km || 
|-id=691 bgcolor=#E9E9E9
| 607691 ||  || — || April 12, 2002 || Haleakala || AMOS ||  || align=right | 1.4 km || 
|-id=692 bgcolor=#d6d6d6
| 607692 ||  || — || April 7, 2002 || Bergisch Gladbach || W. Bickel ||  || align=right | 2.8 km || 
|-id=693 bgcolor=#d6d6d6
| 607693 ||  || — || March 23, 2002 || Kitt Peak || Spacewatch ||  || align=right | 1.9 km || 
|-id=694 bgcolor=#d6d6d6
| 607694 ||  || — || February 13, 2002 || Kitt Peak || Spacewatch ||  || align=right | 2.0 km || 
|-id=695 bgcolor=#fefefe
| 607695 ||  || — || April 2, 2002 || Kitt Peak || Spacewatch ||  || align=right data-sort-value="0.58" | 580 m || 
|-id=696 bgcolor=#d6d6d6
| 607696 ||  || — || April 5, 2002 || Palomar || NEAT ||  || align=right | 4.0 km || 
|-id=697 bgcolor=#E9E9E9
| 607697 ||  || — || April 8, 2002 || Palomar || NEAT || EUN || align=right | 1.2 km || 
|-id=698 bgcolor=#fefefe
| 607698 ||  || — || April 4, 2002 || Palomar || NEAT ||  || align=right data-sort-value="0.70" | 700 m || 
|-id=699 bgcolor=#fefefe
| 607699 ||  || — || April 13, 2002 || Palomar || NEAT || H || align=right data-sort-value="0.74" | 740 m || 
|-id=700 bgcolor=#fefefe
| 607700 ||  || — || April 14, 2002 || Socorro || LINEAR || H || align=right data-sort-value="0.54" | 540 m || 
|}

607701–607800 

|-bgcolor=#d6d6d6
| 607701 ||  || — || April 8, 2002 || Palomar || NEAT ||  || align=right | 3.0 km || 
|-id=702 bgcolor=#fefefe
| 607702 ||  || — || April 4, 2002 || Palomar || NEAT ||  || align=right data-sort-value="0.80" | 800 m || 
|-id=703 bgcolor=#E9E9E9
| 607703 ||  || — || April 10, 2002 || Socorro || LINEAR ||  || align=right data-sort-value="0.96" | 960 m || 
|-id=704 bgcolor=#fefefe
| 607704 ||  || — || April 14, 2002 || Palomar || NEAT || H || align=right data-sort-value="0.66" | 660 m || 
|-id=705 bgcolor=#fefefe
| 607705 ||  || — || April 14, 2002 || Palomar || NEAT ||  || align=right data-sort-value="0.83" | 830 m || 
|-id=706 bgcolor=#fefefe
| 607706 ||  || — || April 24, 2009 || Mount Lemmon || Mount Lemmon Survey ||  || align=right data-sort-value="0.65" | 650 m || 
|-id=707 bgcolor=#d6d6d6
| 607707 ||  || — || February 26, 2007 || Mount Lemmon || Mount Lemmon Survey ||  || align=right | 2.1 km || 
|-id=708 bgcolor=#E9E9E9
| 607708 ||  || — || March 5, 2006 || Mount Lemmon || Mount Lemmon Survey ||  || align=right | 1.5 km || 
|-id=709 bgcolor=#fefefe
| 607709 ||  || — || April 4, 2002 || Haleakala || AMOS ||  || align=right data-sort-value="0.76" | 760 m || 
|-id=710 bgcolor=#d6d6d6
| 607710 ||  || — || September 19, 2009 || Catalina || CSS ||  || align=right | 3.4 km || 
|-id=711 bgcolor=#E9E9E9
| 607711 ||  || — || December 1, 2008 || Kitt Peak || Spacewatch ||  || align=right | 1.2 km || 
|-id=712 bgcolor=#d6d6d6
| 607712 ||  || — || October 9, 2004 || Palomar || NEAT || EOS || align=right | 2.6 km || 
|-id=713 bgcolor=#d6d6d6
| 607713 ||  || — || March 11, 2007 || Kitt Peak || Spacewatch ||  || align=right | 2.9 km || 
|-id=714 bgcolor=#fefefe
| 607714 ||  || — || March 12, 2002 || Kitt Peak || Spacewatch ||  || align=right data-sort-value="0.60" | 600 m || 
|-id=715 bgcolor=#E9E9E9
| 607715 ||  || — || October 1, 2003 || Kitt Peak || Spacewatch || JUN || align=right | 1.0 km || 
|-id=716 bgcolor=#E9E9E9
| 607716 ||  || — || February 11, 2014 || Mount Lemmon || Mount Lemmon Survey || EUN || align=right | 1.2 km || 
|-id=717 bgcolor=#E9E9E9
| 607717 ||  || — || February 9, 2010 || Kitt Peak || Spacewatch ||  || align=right | 1.1 km || 
|-id=718 bgcolor=#E9E9E9
| 607718 ||  || — || August 25, 2003 || Palomar || NEAT ||  || align=right | 1.5 km || 
|-id=719 bgcolor=#fefefe
| 607719 ||  || — || November 3, 2007 || Kitt Peak || Spacewatch ||  || align=right data-sort-value="0.75" | 750 m || 
|-id=720 bgcolor=#fefefe
| 607720 ||  || — || April 8, 2002 || Kitt Peak || Spacewatch ||  || align=right data-sort-value="0.68" | 680 m || 
|-id=721 bgcolor=#E9E9E9
| 607721 ||  || — || May 20, 2015 || Haleakala || Pan-STARRS ||  || align=right | 1.4 km || 
|-id=722 bgcolor=#d6d6d6
| 607722 ||  || — || May 27, 2014 || Haleakala || Pan-STARRS ||  || align=right | 3.2 km || 
|-id=723 bgcolor=#d6d6d6
| 607723 ||  || — || April 11, 2002 || Palomar || NEAT ||  || align=right | 2.9 km || 
|-id=724 bgcolor=#d6d6d6
| 607724 ||  || — || August 28, 2014 || Haleakala || Pan-STARRS ||  || align=right | 2.5 km || 
|-id=725 bgcolor=#E9E9E9
| 607725 ||  || — || October 20, 2012 || Kitt Peak || Spacewatch ||  || align=right | 1.3 km || 
|-id=726 bgcolor=#E9E9E9
| 607726 ||  || — || October 11, 2012 || Mount Lemmon || Mount Lemmon Survey ||  || align=right data-sort-value="0.91" | 910 m || 
|-id=727 bgcolor=#d6d6d6
| 607727 ||  || — || July 25, 2008 || Mount Lemmon || Mount Lemmon Survey ||  || align=right | 2.8 km || 
|-id=728 bgcolor=#d6d6d6
| 607728 ||  || — || May 8, 2013 || Ka-Dar || V. Gerke ||  || align=right | 2.9 km || 
|-id=729 bgcolor=#fefefe
| 607729 ||  || — || April 6, 2002 || Kitt Peak || Spacewatch ||  || align=right data-sort-value="0.68" | 680 m || 
|-id=730 bgcolor=#fefefe
| 607730 ||  || — || April 4, 2016 || Haleakala || Pan-STARRS ||  || align=right data-sort-value="0.68" | 680 m || 
|-id=731 bgcolor=#d6d6d6
| 607731 ||  || — || June 27, 2014 || Haleakala || Pan-STARRS ||  || align=right | 2.4 km || 
|-id=732 bgcolor=#fefefe
| 607732 ||  || — || April 4, 2002 || Kitt Peak || Spacewatch ||  || align=right data-sort-value="0.64" | 640 m || 
|-id=733 bgcolor=#d6d6d6
| 607733 ||  || — || September 27, 2014 || Mount Lemmon || Mount Lemmon Survey ||  || align=right | 2.1 km || 
|-id=734 bgcolor=#E9E9E9
| 607734 ||  || — || October 10, 2016 || Haleakala || Pan-STARRS ||  || align=right | 1.2 km || 
|-id=735 bgcolor=#d6d6d6
| 607735 ||  || — || April 7, 2002 || Cerro Tololo || Cerro Tololo Obs. ||  || align=right | 2.0 km || 
|-id=736 bgcolor=#d6d6d6
| 607736 ||  || — || July 29, 2013 || La Sagra || OAM Obs. ||  || align=right | 3.0 km || 
|-id=737 bgcolor=#E9E9E9
| 607737 ||  || — || May 5, 2002 || Palomar || NEAT ||  || align=right | 1.4 km || 
|-id=738 bgcolor=#d6d6d6
| 607738 ||  || — || May 7, 2002 || Palomar || NEAT ||  || align=right | 2.7 km || 
|-id=739 bgcolor=#fefefe
| 607739 ||  || — || May 4, 2002 || Kitt Peak || Spacewatch ||  || align=right data-sort-value="0.58" | 580 m || 
|-id=740 bgcolor=#d6d6d6
| 607740 ||  || — || May 11, 2002 || Socorro || LINEAR ||  || align=right | 4.4 km || 
|-id=741 bgcolor=#E9E9E9
| 607741 ||  || — || May 7, 2002 || Palomar || NEAT || EUN || align=right | 1.3 km || 
|-id=742 bgcolor=#E9E9E9
| 607742 ||  || — || April 12, 2002 || Kitt Peak || Spacewatch ||  || align=right | 2.1 km || 
|-id=743 bgcolor=#fefefe
| 607743 ||  || — || May 6, 2002 || Kitt Peak || Spacewatch ||  || align=right data-sort-value="0.62" | 620 m || 
|-id=744 bgcolor=#E9E9E9
| 607744 ||  || — || February 16, 2010 || Mount Lemmon || Mount Lemmon Survey ||  || align=right | 1.1 km || 
|-id=745 bgcolor=#d6d6d6
| 607745 ||  || — || September 23, 2003 || Palomar || NEAT ||  || align=right | 3.4 km || 
|-id=746 bgcolor=#fefefe
| 607746 ||  || — || April 30, 2009 || Kitt Peak || Spacewatch ||  || align=right data-sort-value="0.82" | 820 m || 
|-id=747 bgcolor=#d6d6d6
| 607747 ||  || — || August 16, 2014 || Haleakala || Pan-STARRS ||  || align=right | 4.0 km || 
|-id=748 bgcolor=#d6d6d6
| 607748 ||  || — || August 16, 2014 || Haleakala || Pan-STARRS ||  || align=right | 3.2 km || 
|-id=749 bgcolor=#E9E9E9
| 607749 ||  || — || October 9, 2016 || Haleakala || Pan-STARRS ||  || align=right | 1.3 km || 
|-id=750 bgcolor=#E9E9E9
| 607750 ||  || — || May 8, 2002 || Kitt Peak || Spacewatch ||  || align=right data-sort-value="0.82" | 820 m || 
|-id=751 bgcolor=#E9E9E9
| 607751 ||  || — || May 8, 2002 || Kitt Peak || Spacewatch ||  || align=right | 1.2 km || 
|-id=752 bgcolor=#E9E9E9
| 607752 ||  || — || December 22, 2008 || Kitt Peak || Spacewatch ||  || align=right | 1.6 km || 
|-id=753 bgcolor=#d6d6d6
| 607753 ||  || — || August 29, 2009 || Kitt Peak || Spacewatch ||  || align=right | 2.6 km || 
|-id=754 bgcolor=#E9E9E9
| 607754 ||  || — || October 29, 2017 || Haleakala || Pan-STARRS ||  || align=right | 1.2 km || 
|-id=755 bgcolor=#fefefe
| 607755 ||  || — || October 19, 2003 || Kitt Peak || Spacewatch ||  || align=right data-sort-value="0.70" | 700 m || 
|-id=756 bgcolor=#d6d6d6
| 607756 ||  || — || May 17, 2002 || Kitt Peak || Spacewatch ||  || align=right | 3.2 km || 
|-id=757 bgcolor=#fefefe
| 607757 ||  || — || May 17, 2002 || Palomar || NEAT ||  || align=right data-sort-value="0.80" | 800 m || 
|-id=758 bgcolor=#E9E9E9
| 607758 ||  || — || June 15, 2002 || Kitt Peak || Spacewatch ||  || align=right | 1.6 km || 
|-id=759 bgcolor=#E9E9E9
| 607759 ||  || — || February 24, 2006 || Catalina || CSS ||  || align=right | 1.8 km || 
|-id=760 bgcolor=#d6d6d6
| 607760 ||  || — || May 14, 2008 || Mount Lemmon || Mount Lemmon Survey ||  || align=right | 3.5 km || 
|-id=761 bgcolor=#E9E9E9
| 607761 ||  || — || July 24, 2015 || Haleakala || Pan-STARRS ||  || align=right | 1.0 km || 
|-id=762 bgcolor=#FA8072
| 607762 ||  || — || June 6, 2002 || Socorro || LINEAR ||  || align=right | 1.1 km || 
|-id=763 bgcolor=#fefefe
| 607763 ||  || — || June 3, 2002 || Palomar || NEAT ||  || align=right data-sort-value="0.77" | 770 m || 
|-id=764 bgcolor=#d6d6d6
| 607764 ||  || — || June 10, 2002 || Socorro || LINEAR ||  || align=right | 5.7 km || 
|-id=765 bgcolor=#E9E9E9
| 607765 ||  || — || January 18, 2005 || Kitt Peak || Spacewatch ||  || align=right | 1.9 km || 
|-id=766 bgcolor=#E9E9E9
| 607766 ||  || — || March 23, 2006 || Mount Lemmon || Mount Lemmon Survey ||  || align=right | 1.9 km || 
|-id=767 bgcolor=#d6d6d6
| 607767 ||  || — || July 12, 2002 || Palomar || NEAT ||  || align=right | 2.9 km || 
|-id=768 bgcolor=#E9E9E9
| 607768 ||  || — || January 9, 2014 || Haleakala || Pan-STARRS ||  || align=right | 2.0 km || 
|-id=769 bgcolor=#d6d6d6
| 607769 ||  || — || June 2, 2013 || Mount Lemmon || Mount Lemmon Survey ||  || align=right | 2.4 km || 
|-id=770 bgcolor=#d6d6d6
| 607770 ||  || — || April 12, 2013 || Haleakala || Pan-STARRS ||  || align=right | 2.3 km || 
|-id=771 bgcolor=#d6d6d6
| 607771 ||  || — || January 8, 2006 || Mount Lemmon || Mount Lemmon Survey || LIX || align=right | 3.5 km || 
|-id=772 bgcolor=#E9E9E9
| 607772 ||  || — || December 21, 2008 || Mount Lemmon || Mount Lemmon Survey || EUN || align=right | 1.1 km || 
|-id=773 bgcolor=#d6d6d6
| 607773 ||  || — || January 28, 2006 || Mount Lemmon || Mount Lemmon Survey ||  || align=right | 3.3 km || 
|-id=774 bgcolor=#d6d6d6
| 607774 ||  || — || April 26, 2007 || Mount Lemmon || Mount Lemmon Survey ||  || align=right | 3.0 km || 
|-id=775 bgcolor=#d6d6d6
| 607775 ||  || — || December 19, 2004 || Mount Lemmon || Mount Lemmon Survey ||  || align=right | 2.9 km || 
|-id=776 bgcolor=#E9E9E9
| 607776 ||  || — || October 11, 2007 || Mount Lemmon || Mount Lemmon Survey ||  || align=right | 1.7 km || 
|-id=777 bgcolor=#d6d6d6
| 607777 ||  || — || June 17, 2002 || Palomar || NEAT || Tj (2.97) || align=right | 3.0 km || 
|-id=778 bgcolor=#E9E9E9
| 607778 ||  || — || July 4, 2002 || Palomar || NEAT ||  || align=right | 1.5 km || 
|-id=779 bgcolor=#fefefe
| 607779 ||  || — || June 12, 2002 || Palomar || NEAT || PHO || align=right | 1.2 km || 
|-id=780 bgcolor=#fefefe
| 607780 ||  || — || July 13, 2002 || Palomar || NEAT ||  || align=right data-sort-value="0.72" | 720 m || 
|-id=781 bgcolor=#E9E9E9
| 607781 ||  || — || July 3, 2002 || Palomar || NEAT ||  || align=right | 1.6 km || 
|-id=782 bgcolor=#fefefe
| 607782 ||  || — || July 9, 2002 || Palomar || NEAT ||  || align=right data-sort-value="0.88" | 880 m || 
|-id=783 bgcolor=#fefefe
| 607783 ||  || — || July 5, 2002 || Palomar || NEAT ||  || align=right data-sort-value="0.79" | 790 m || 
|-id=784 bgcolor=#fefefe
| 607784 ||  || — || October 4, 2006 || Mount Lemmon || Mount Lemmon Survey ||  || align=right data-sort-value="0.73" | 730 m || 
|-id=785 bgcolor=#d6d6d6
| 607785 ||  || — || October 2, 2008 || Mount Lemmon || Mount Lemmon Survey ||  || align=right | 2.4 km || 
|-id=786 bgcolor=#E9E9E9
| 607786 ||  || — || February 2, 2005 || Catalina || CSS ||  || align=right | 1.8 km || 
|-id=787 bgcolor=#fefefe
| 607787 ||  || — || April 2, 2009 || Mount Lemmon || Mount Lemmon Survey ||  || align=right data-sort-value="0.57" | 570 m || 
|-id=788 bgcolor=#fefefe
| 607788 ||  || — || August 16, 2009 || Catalina || CSS || BAP || align=right | 1.2 km || 
|-id=789 bgcolor=#fefefe
| 607789 ||  || — || February 1, 2008 || Kitt Peak || Spacewatch ||  || align=right data-sort-value="0.77" | 770 m || 
|-id=790 bgcolor=#E9E9E9
| 607790 ||  || — || October 9, 2007 || Kitt Peak || Spacewatch ||  || align=right | 1.3 km || 
|-id=791 bgcolor=#d6d6d6
| 607791 ||  || — || January 26, 2011 || Mount Lemmon || Mount Lemmon Survey ||  || align=right | 2.7 km || 
|-id=792 bgcolor=#fefefe
| 607792 ||  || — || January 30, 2008 || Mount Lemmon || Mount Lemmon Survey ||  || align=right data-sort-value="0.85" | 850 m || 
|-id=793 bgcolor=#fefefe
| 607793 ||  || — || August 13, 2013 || Kitt Peak || Spacewatch ||  || align=right data-sort-value="0.73" | 730 m || 
|-id=794 bgcolor=#E9E9E9
| 607794 ||  || — || December 22, 2008 || Mount Lemmon || Mount Lemmon Survey ||  || align=right | 2.1 km || 
|-id=795 bgcolor=#E9E9E9
| 607795 ||  || — || December 19, 2003 || Socorro || LINEAR ||  || align=right | 2.3 km || 
|-id=796 bgcolor=#E9E9E9
| 607796 ||  || — || December 27, 2003 || Kitt Peak || Spacewatch ||  || align=right | 2.2 km || 
|-id=797 bgcolor=#d6d6d6
| 607797 ||  || — || July 6, 2013 || Haleakala || Pan-STARRS ||  || align=right | 3.1 km || 
|-id=798 bgcolor=#fefefe
| 607798 ||  || — || February 13, 2012 || Haleakala || Pan-STARRS ||  || align=right data-sort-value="0.85" | 850 m || 
|-id=799 bgcolor=#E9E9E9
| 607799 ||  || — || March 17, 2010 || Kitt Peak || Spacewatch ||  || align=right | 1.8 km || 
|-id=800 bgcolor=#d6d6d6
| 607800 ||  || — || February 12, 2011 || Mount Lemmon || Mount Lemmon Survey ||  || align=right | 2.7 km || 
|}

607801–607900 

|-bgcolor=#FA8072
| 607801 ||  || — || July 20, 2002 || Palomar || NEAT ||  || align=right data-sort-value="0.72" | 720 m || 
|-id=802 bgcolor=#d6d6d6
| 607802 ||  || — || July 18, 2002 || Palomar || NEAT || Tj (2.99) || align=right | 3.6 km || 
|-id=803 bgcolor=#E9E9E9
| 607803 ||  || — || July 18, 2002 || Socorro || LINEAR ||  || align=right | 1.7 km || 
|-id=804 bgcolor=#fefefe
| 607804 ||  || — || August 11, 2002 || Palomar || NEAT ||  || align=right data-sort-value="0.73" | 730 m || 
|-id=805 bgcolor=#E9E9E9
| 607805 ||  || — || January 3, 2009 || Mount Lemmon || Mount Lemmon Survey ||  || align=right | 1.6 km || 
|-id=806 bgcolor=#E9E9E9
| 607806 ||  || — || October 19, 2007 || Catalina || CSS ||  || align=right | 2.1 km || 
|-id=807 bgcolor=#E9E9E9
| 607807 ||  || — || October 14, 2007 || Catalina || CSS ||  || align=right | 1.6 km || 
|-id=808 bgcolor=#fefefe
| 607808 ||  || — || October 12, 2006 || Palomar || NEAT ||  || align=right data-sort-value="0.74" | 740 m || 
|-id=809 bgcolor=#fefefe
| 607809 ||  || — || August 1, 2002 || Socorro || LINEAR ||  || align=right | 1.2 km || 
|-id=810 bgcolor=#d6d6d6
| 607810 ||  || — || August 5, 2002 || Palomar || NEAT || VER || align=right | 3.0 km || 
|-id=811 bgcolor=#E9E9E9
| 607811 ||  || — || August 6, 2002 || Palomar || NEAT ||  || align=right | 2.0 km || 
|-id=812 bgcolor=#fefefe
| 607812 ||  || — || August 8, 2002 || Palomar || NEAT ||  || align=right data-sort-value="0.74" | 740 m || 
|-id=813 bgcolor=#fefefe
| 607813 ||  || — || August 4, 2002 || Palomar || NEAT ||  || align=right data-sort-value="0.88" | 880 m || 
|-id=814 bgcolor=#E9E9E9
| 607814 ||  || — || August 4, 2002 || Palomar || NEAT ||  || align=right | 2.5 km || 
|-id=815 bgcolor=#E9E9E9
| 607815 ||  || — || July 20, 2002 || Palomar || NEAT || EUN || align=right | 1.3 km || 
|-id=816 bgcolor=#d6d6d6
| 607816 ||  || — || August 9, 2002 || Cerro Tololo || M. W. Buie, S. D. Kern ||  || align=right | 2.2 km || 
|-id=817 bgcolor=#fefefe
| 607817 ||  || — || August 11, 2002 || Cerro Tololo || M. W. Buie, S. D. Kern ||  || align=right data-sort-value="0.48" | 480 m || 
|-id=818 bgcolor=#E9E9E9
| 607818 ||  || — || August 11, 2002 || Palomar || NEAT ||  || align=right | 1.4 km || 
|-id=819 bgcolor=#fefefe
| 607819 ||  || — || August 13, 2002 || Palomar || NEAT ||  || align=right data-sort-value="0.66" | 660 m || 
|-id=820 bgcolor=#E9E9E9
| 607820 ||  || — || August 8, 2002 || Palomar || NEAT ||  || align=right | 2.0 km || 
|-id=821 bgcolor=#d6d6d6
| 607821 ||  || — || July 21, 2002 || Palomar || NEAT ||  || align=right | 3.3 km || 
|-id=822 bgcolor=#fefefe
| 607822 ||  || — || October 3, 2006 || Mount Lemmon || Mount Lemmon Survey ||  || align=right data-sort-value="0.66" | 660 m || 
|-id=823 bgcolor=#fefefe
| 607823 ||  || — || November 21, 2003 || Kitt Peak || Kitt Peak Obs. ||  || align=right data-sort-value="0.52" | 520 m || 
|-id=824 bgcolor=#E9E9E9
| 607824 ||  || — || February 9, 2005 || Mount Lemmon || Mount Lemmon Survey ||  || align=right | 1.5 km || 
|-id=825 bgcolor=#E9E9E9
| 607825 ||  || — || August 11, 2002 || Palomar || NEAT ||  || align=right | 1.7 km || 
|-id=826 bgcolor=#fefefe
| 607826 ||  || — || August 12, 2002 || Haleakala || AMOS ||  || align=right data-sort-value="0.46" | 460 m || 
|-id=827 bgcolor=#d6d6d6
| 607827 ||  || — || August 5, 2002 || Palomar || NEAT ||  || align=right | 3.8 km || 
|-id=828 bgcolor=#fefefe
| 607828 ||  || — || February 11, 2008 || Kitt Peak || Spacewatch ||  || align=right data-sort-value="0.88" | 880 m || 
|-id=829 bgcolor=#d6d6d6
| 607829 ||  || — || December 14, 2004 || Campo Imperatore || CINEOS ||  || align=right | 3.9 km || 
|-id=830 bgcolor=#E9E9E9
| 607830 ||  || — || May 26, 2006 || Mount Lemmon || Mount Lemmon Survey ||  || align=right | 1.2 km || 
|-id=831 bgcolor=#E9E9E9
| 607831 ||  || — || August 11, 2002 || Palomar || NEAT ||  || align=right | 1.8 km || 
|-id=832 bgcolor=#d6d6d6
| 607832 ||  || — || May 11, 2007 || Mount Lemmon || Mount Lemmon Survey ||  || align=right | 2.5 km || 
|-id=833 bgcolor=#fefefe
| 607833 ||  || — || November 16, 2006 || Mount Lemmon || Mount Lemmon Survey ||  || align=right data-sort-value="0.85" | 850 m || 
|-id=834 bgcolor=#d6d6d6
| 607834 ||  || — || August 12, 2002 || Haleakala || AMOS ||  || align=right | 3.7 km || 
|-id=835 bgcolor=#E9E9E9
| 607835 ||  || — || September 14, 2007 || Mount Lemmon || Mount Lemmon Survey ||  || align=right | 1.5 km || 
|-id=836 bgcolor=#d6d6d6
| 607836 ||  || — || September 25, 2008 || Mount Lemmon || Mount Lemmon Survey ||  || align=right | 2.9 km || 
|-id=837 bgcolor=#fefefe
| 607837 ||  || — || March 3, 2005 || Kitt Peak || Spacewatch ||  || align=right | 1.1 km || 
|-id=838 bgcolor=#fefefe
| 607838 ||  || — || October 17, 2006 || Kitt Peak || Spacewatch ||  || align=right data-sort-value="0.73" | 730 m || 
|-id=839 bgcolor=#E9E9E9
| 607839 ||  || — || January 18, 2005 || Kitt Peak || Spacewatch ||  || align=right | 1.5 km || 
|-id=840 bgcolor=#d6d6d6
| 607840 ||  || — || March 9, 2011 || Catalina || CSS ||  || align=right | 4.3 km || 
|-id=841 bgcolor=#fefefe
| 607841 ||  || — || March 5, 2009 || Siding Spring || SSS || H || align=right data-sort-value="0.82" | 820 m || 
|-id=842 bgcolor=#d6d6d6
| 607842 ||  || — || December 2, 2005 || Kitt Peak || L. H. Wasserman, R. Millis ||  || align=right | 3.2 km || 
|-id=843 bgcolor=#d6d6d6
| 607843 ||  || — || October 22, 2009 || Mount Lemmon || Mount Lemmon Survey ||  || align=right | 3.1 km || 
|-id=844 bgcolor=#d6d6d6
| 607844 ||  || — || April 24, 2012 || Mount Lemmon || Mount Lemmon Survey ||  || align=right | 3.4 km || 
|-id=845 bgcolor=#d6d6d6
| 607845 ||  || — || June 8, 2013 || Mount Lemmon || Mount Lemmon Survey ||  || align=right | 3.3 km || 
|-id=846 bgcolor=#fefefe
| 607846 ||  || — || January 19, 2004 || Kitt Peak || Spacewatch ||  || align=right data-sort-value="0.90" | 900 m || 
|-id=847 bgcolor=#d6d6d6
| 607847 ||  || — || January 12, 2011 || Kitt Peak || Spacewatch ||  || align=right | 3.2 km || 
|-id=848 bgcolor=#E9E9E9
| 607848 ||  || — || October 29, 2016 || Mount Lemmon || Mount Lemmon Survey ||  || align=right | 1.9 km || 
|-id=849 bgcolor=#E9E9E9
| 607849 ||  || — || August 4, 2002 || Palomar || NEAT ||  || align=right | 1.5 km || 
|-id=850 bgcolor=#E9E9E9
| 607850 ||  || — || June 12, 2011 || Mount Lemmon || Mount Lemmon Survey ||  || align=right | 2.0 km || 
|-id=851 bgcolor=#E9E9E9
| 607851 ||  || — || August 3, 2002 || Palomar || NEAT ||  || align=right | 1.8 km || 
|-id=852 bgcolor=#E9E9E9
| 607852 ||  || — || August 18, 2002 || Palomar || NEAT ||  || align=right | 2.2 km || 
|-id=853 bgcolor=#E9E9E9
| 607853 ||  || — || August 28, 2002 || Palomar || NEAT ||  || align=right | 1.4 km || 
|-id=854 bgcolor=#E9E9E9
| 607854 ||  || — || August 29, 2002 || Palomar || NEAT ||  || align=right | 2.6 km || 
|-id=855 bgcolor=#E9E9E9
| 607855 ||  || — || August 20, 2002 || Palomar || NEAT ||  || align=right | 1.8 km || 
|-id=856 bgcolor=#d6d6d6
| 607856 ||  || — || August 27, 2002 || Palomar || NEAT ||  || align=right | 3.5 km || 
|-id=857 bgcolor=#fefefe
| 607857 ||  || — || September 6, 2002 || Socorro || LINEAR ||  || align=right data-sort-value="0.78" | 780 m || 
|-id=858 bgcolor=#d6d6d6
| 607858 ||  || — || August 18, 2002 || Palomar || NEAT ||  || align=right | 3.5 km || 
|-id=859 bgcolor=#E9E9E9
| 607859 ||  || — || August 18, 2002 || Palomar || NEAT ||  || align=right | 1.8 km || 
|-id=860 bgcolor=#d6d6d6
| 607860 ||  || — || August 18, 2002 || Palomar || NEAT ||  || align=right | 2.6 km || 
|-id=861 bgcolor=#fefefe
| 607861 ||  || — || August 18, 2002 || Palomar || NEAT ||  || align=right data-sort-value="0.65" | 650 m || 
|-id=862 bgcolor=#d6d6d6
| 607862 ||  || — || August 19, 2002 || Palomar || NEAT ||  || align=right | 2.6 km || 
|-id=863 bgcolor=#d6d6d6
| 607863 ||  || — || November 19, 2003 || Palomar || NEAT ||  || align=right | 3.5 km || 
|-id=864 bgcolor=#E9E9E9
| 607864 ||  || — || August 12, 2002 || Haleakala || AMOS || HNS || align=right | 1.2 km || 
|-id=865 bgcolor=#E9E9E9
| 607865 ||  || — || August 27, 2002 || Palomar || NEAT ||  || align=right | 1.4 km || 
|-id=866 bgcolor=#d6d6d6
| 607866 ||  || — || December 3, 2005 || Mauna Kea || Mauna Kea Obs. ||  || align=right | 2.6 km || 
|-id=867 bgcolor=#d6d6d6
| 607867 ||  || — || August 19, 2002 || Palomar || NEAT ||  || align=right | 3.7 km || 
|-id=868 bgcolor=#d6d6d6
| 607868 ||  || — || August 18, 2002 || Palomar || NEAT ||  || align=right | 2.6 km || 
|-id=869 bgcolor=#fefefe
| 607869 ||  || — || August 16, 2002 || Palomar || NEAT ||  || align=right data-sort-value="0.66" | 660 m || 
|-id=870 bgcolor=#fefefe
| 607870 ||  || — || August 19, 2002 || Palomar || NEAT ||  || align=right data-sort-value="0.68" | 680 m || 
|-id=871 bgcolor=#E9E9E9
| 607871 ||  || — || August 27, 2002 || Palomar || NEAT ||  || align=right | 1.9 km || 
|-id=872 bgcolor=#d6d6d6
| 607872 ||  || — || August 17, 2002 || Palomar || NEAT ||  || align=right | 2.7 km || 
|-id=873 bgcolor=#d6d6d6
| 607873 ||  || — || July 6, 2002 || Kitt Peak || Spacewatch ||  || align=right | 2.9 km || 
|-id=874 bgcolor=#d6d6d6
| 607874 ||  || — || July 22, 2002 || Palomar || NEAT ||  || align=right | 2.9 km || 
|-id=875 bgcolor=#d6d6d6
| 607875 ||  || — || August 16, 2002 || Palomar || NEAT ||  || align=right | 2.5 km || 
|-id=876 bgcolor=#d6d6d6
| 607876 ||  || — || February 25, 2006 || Mount Lemmon || Mount Lemmon Survey ||  || align=right | 2.9 km || 
|-id=877 bgcolor=#d6d6d6
| 607877 ||  || — || August 17, 2002 || Palomar || NEAT ||  || align=right | 2.8 km || 
|-id=878 bgcolor=#E9E9E9
| 607878 ||  || — || December 16, 2007 || Mount Lemmon || Mount Lemmon Survey ||  || align=right | 1.7 km || 
|-id=879 bgcolor=#fefefe
| 607879 ||  || — || July 4, 2002 || Palomar || NEAT ||  || align=right data-sort-value="0.52" | 520 m || 
|-id=880 bgcolor=#fefefe
| 607880 ||  || — || August 19, 2002 || Palomar || NEAT || V || align=right data-sort-value="0.54" | 540 m || 
|-id=881 bgcolor=#d6d6d6
| 607881 ||  || — || September 4, 2008 || Kitt Peak || Spacewatch ||  || align=right | 2.9 km || 
|-id=882 bgcolor=#d6d6d6
| 607882 ||  || — || August 18, 2002 || Palomar || NEAT ||  || align=right | 2.3 km || 
|-id=883 bgcolor=#E9E9E9
| 607883 ||  || — || August 19, 2002 || Palomar || NEAT || MRX || align=right data-sort-value="0.83" | 830 m || 
|-id=884 bgcolor=#d6d6d6
| 607884 ||  || — || January 16, 2005 || Kitt Peak || Spacewatch ||  || align=right | 3.0 km || 
|-id=885 bgcolor=#E9E9E9
| 607885 ||  || — || March 17, 2009 || Kitt Peak || Spacewatch ||  || align=right | 1.8 km || 
|-id=886 bgcolor=#E9E9E9
| 607886 ||  || — || February 3, 2009 || Mount Lemmon || Mount Lemmon Survey ||  || align=right | 1.8 km || 
|-id=887 bgcolor=#E9E9E9
| 607887 ||  || — || November 2, 2007 || Kitt Peak || Spacewatch ||  || align=right | 1.7 km || 
|-id=888 bgcolor=#fefefe
| 607888 ||  || — || May 13, 2005 || Siding Spring || SSS ||  || align=right data-sort-value="0.83" | 830 m || 
|-id=889 bgcolor=#E9E9E9
| 607889 ||  || — || October 20, 2007 || Mount Lemmon || Mount Lemmon Survey ||  || align=right | 1.6 km || 
|-id=890 bgcolor=#fefefe
| 607890 ||  || — || May 29, 2009 || Mount Lemmon || Mount Lemmon Survey ||  || align=right data-sort-value="0.48" | 480 m || 
|-id=891 bgcolor=#fefefe
| 607891 ||  || — || May 14, 2005 || Kitt Peak || Spacewatch ||  || align=right data-sort-value="0.60" | 600 m || 
|-id=892 bgcolor=#d6d6d6
| 607892 ||  || — || February 11, 2011 || Mount Lemmon || Mount Lemmon Survey ||  || align=right | 2.8 km || 
|-id=893 bgcolor=#fefefe
| 607893 ||  || — || February 9, 2008 || Mount Lemmon || Mount Lemmon Survey || (2076) || align=right data-sort-value="0.65" | 650 m || 
|-id=894 bgcolor=#E9E9E9
| 607894 ||  || — || November 1, 2007 || Mount Lemmon || Mount Lemmon Survey ||  || align=right | 1.6 km || 
|-id=895 bgcolor=#E9E9E9
| 607895 ||  || — || October 10, 2007 || Kitt Peak || Spacewatch ||  || align=right | 1.5 km || 
|-id=896 bgcolor=#E9E9E9
| 607896 ||  || — || October 15, 2007 || Kitt Peak || Spacewatch ||  || align=right | 1.7 km || 
|-id=897 bgcolor=#d6d6d6
| 607897 ||  || — || July 30, 2008 || Kitt Peak || Spacewatch ||  || align=right | 2.7 km || 
|-id=898 bgcolor=#fefefe
| 607898 ||  || — || July 21, 2006 || Mount Lemmon || Mount Lemmon Survey ||  || align=right data-sort-value="0.82" | 820 m || 
|-id=899 bgcolor=#E9E9E9
| 607899 ||  || — || January 18, 2009 || Kitt Peak || Spacewatch ||  || align=right | 1.8 km || 
|-id=900 bgcolor=#d6d6d6
| 607900 ||  || — || March 30, 2011 || Haleakala || Pan-STARRS ||  || align=right | 2.8 km || 
|}

607901–608000 

|-bgcolor=#E9E9E9
| 607901 ||  || — || October 12, 2007 || Mount Lemmon || Mount Lemmon Survey || NEM || align=right | 2.4 km || 
|-id=902 bgcolor=#fefefe
| 607902 ||  || — || October 16, 2006 || Catalina || CSS ||  || align=right data-sort-value="0.84" | 840 m || 
|-id=903 bgcolor=#fefefe
| 607903 ||  || — || October 22, 2006 || Catalina || CSS ||  || align=right data-sort-value="0.95" | 950 m || 
|-id=904 bgcolor=#E9E9E9
| 607904 ||  || — || September 15, 2002 || Palomar || NEAT ||  || align=right | 1.9 km || 
|-id=905 bgcolor=#d6d6d6
| 607905 ||  || — || October 8, 2008 || Mount Lemmon || Mount Lemmon Survey ||  || align=right | 3.3 km || 
|-id=906 bgcolor=#E9E9E9
| 607906 ||  || — || December 21, 2008 || Kitt Peak || Spacewatch ||  || align=right | 2.1 km || 
|-id=907 bgcolor=#d6d6d6
| 607907 ||  || — || August 5, 2002 || Palomar || NEAT ||  || align=right | 3.1 km || 
|-id=908 bgcolor=#fefefe
| 607908 ||  || — || June 16, 1998 || Kitt Peak || Spacewatch ||  || align=right data-sort-value="0.82" | 820 m || 
|-id=909 bgcolor=#E9E9E9
| 607909 ||  || — || February 4, 2009 || Mount Lemmon || Mount Lemmon Survey ||  || align=right | 1.9 km || 
|-id=910 bgcolor=#d6d6d6
| 607910 ||  || — || June 5, 2018 || Haleakala || Pan-STARRS ||  || align=right | 2.6 km || 
|-id=911 bgcolor=#d6d6d6
| 607911 ||  || — || October 21, 2014 || Kitt Peak || Spacewatch ||  || align=right | 2.5 km || 
|-id=912 bgcolor=#E9E9E9
| 607912 ||  || — || September 19, 2011 || Catalina || CSS ||  || align=right | 2.1 km || 
|-id=913 bgcolor=#E9E9E9
| 607913 ||  || — || August 15, 2002 || Anderson Mesa || LONEOS ||  || align=right | 1.7 km || 
|-id=914 bgcolor=#E9E9E9
| 607914 ||  || — || September 3, 2002 || Palomar || NEAT ||  || align=right | 1.9 km || 
|-id=915 bgcolor=#fefefe
| 607915 ||  || — || September 11, 2002 || Palomar || NEAT ||  || align=right data-sort-value="0.68" | 680 m || 
|-id=916 bgcolor=#d6d6d6
| 607916 ||  || — || September 11, 2002 || Palomar || NEAT ||  || align=right | 4.0 km || 
|-id=917 bgcolor=#d6d6d6
| 607917 ||  || — || September 6, 2002 || Socorro || LINEAR ||  || align=right | 3.7 km || 
|-id=918 bgcolor=#E9E9E9
| 607918 ||  || — || September 11, 2002 || Palomar || NEAT ||  || align=right | 2.1 km || 
|-id=919 bgcolor=#fefefe
| 607919 ||  || — || September 13, 2002 || Palomar || NEAT ||  || align=right data-sort-value="0.75" | 750 m || 
|-id=920 bgcolor=#fefefe
| 607920 ||  || — || September 13, 2002 || Palomar || NEAT ||  || align=right data-sort-value="0.88" | 880 m || 
|-id=921 bgcolor=#E9E9E9
| 607921 ||  || — || September 13, 2002 || Palomar || NEAT ||  || align=right | 1.7 km || 
|-id=922 bgcolor=#fefefe
| 607922 ||  || — || September 12, 2002 || Palomar || NEAT || H || align=right data-sort-value="0.60" | 600 m || 
|-id=923 bgcolor=#E9E9E9
| 607923 ||  || — || September 5, 2002 || Socorro || LINEAR ||  || align=right | 2.3 km || 
|-id=924 bgcolor=#d6d6d6
| 607924 ||  || — || September 6, 2002 || Socorro || LINEAR ||  || align=right | 3.6 km || 
|-id=925 bgcolor=#E9E9E9
| 607925 ||  || — || September 5, 2002 || Socorro || LINEAR ||  || align=right | 2.3 km || 
|-id=926 bgcolor=#E9E9E9
| 607926 ||  || — || September 15, 2002 || Kitt Peak || Spacewatch ||  || align=right | 1.6 km || 
|-id=927 bgcolor=#fefefe
| 607927 ||  || — || May 4, 2005 || Kitt Peak || Spacewatch ||  || align=right | 1.1 km || 
|-id=928 bgcolor=#E9E9E9
| 607928 ||  || — || September 15, 2002 || Palomar || NEAT ||  || align=right | 1.9 km || 
|-id=929 bgcolor=#E9E9E9
| 607929 ||  || — || August 19, 2002 || Palomar || NEAT || EUN || align=right | 1.0 km || 
|-id=930 bgcolor=#E9E9E9
| 607930 ||  || — || August 29, 2002 || Palomar || NEAT ||  || align=right | 2.1 km || 
|-id=931 bgcolor=#fefefe
| 607931 ||  || — || August 27, 2002 || Palomar || NEAT ||  || align=right data-sort-value="0.64" | 640 m || 
|-id=932 bgcolor=#fefefe
| 607932 ||  || — || October 9, 2002 || Kitt Peak || Spacewatch ||  || align=right data-sort-value="0.64" | 640 m || 
|-id=933 bgcolor=#fefefe
| 607933 ||  || — || September 9, 2002 || Haleakala || AMOS || MAS || align=right data-sort-value="0.57" | 570 m || 
|-id=934 bgcolor=#E9E9E9
| 607934 ||  || — || October 9, 2002 || Kitt Peak || Spacewatch ||  || align=right | 1.6 km || 
|-id=935 bgcolor=#E9E9E9
| 607935 ||  || — || September 12, 2002 || Palomar || NEAT ||  || align=right | 1.3 km || 
|-id=936 bgcolor=#d6d6d6
| 607936 ||  || — || September 13, 2002 || Palomar || NEAT ||  || align=right | 3.2 km || 
|-id=937 bgcolor=#d6d6d6
| 607937 ||  || — || September 11, 2002 || Palomar || NEAT ||  || align=right | 2.7 km || 
|-id=938 bgcolor=#E9E9E9
| 607938 ||  || — || October 10, 2002 || Apache Point || SDSS Collaboration || MRX || align=right data-sort-value="0.79" | 790 m || 
|-id=939 bgcolor=#E9E9E9
| 607939 ||  || — || December 29, 2003 || Kitt Peak || Spacewatch ||  || align=right | 1.8 km || 
|-id=940 bgcolor=#E9E9E9
| 607940 ||  || — || March 11, 2005 || Mount Lemmon || Mount Lemmon Survey ||  || align=right | 1.9 km || 
|-id=941 bgcolor=#d6d6d6
| 607941 ||  || — || September 1, 2002 || Palomar || NEAT ||  || align=right | 2.8 km || 
|-id=942 bgcolor=#E9E9E9
| 607942 ||  || — || March 8, 2005 || Mount Lemmon || Mount Lemmon Survey ||  || align=right | 1.4 km || 
|-id=943 bgcolor=#d6d6d6
| 607943 ||  || — || March 11, 2005 || Mount Lemmon || Mount Lemmon Survey ||  || align=right | 2.9 km || 
|-id=944 bgcolor=#d6d6d6
| 607944 ||  || — || September 12, 2002 || Palomar || NEAT ||  || align=right | 2.6 km || 
|-id=945 bgcolor=#E9E9E9
| 607945 ||  || — || October 9, 2007 || Kitt Peak || Spacewatch ||  || align=right | 1.6 km || 
|-id=946 bgcolor=#E9E9E9
| 607946 ||  || — || July 20, 2006 || Siding Spring || SSS || EUN || align=right | 1.4 km || 
|-id=947 bgcolor=#E9E9E9
| 607947 ||  || — || August 18, 2006 || Kitt Peak || Spacewatch ||  || align=right data-sort-value="0.99" | 990 m || 
|-id=948 bgcolor=#E9E9E9
| 607948 ||  || — || October 10, 2007 || Mount Lemmon || Mount Lemmon Survey ||  || align=right | 2.0 km || 
|-id=949 bgcolor=#d6d6d6
| 607949 ||  || — || January 28, 2006 || Catalina || CSS || Tj (2.99) || align=right | 3.9 km || 
|-id=950 bgcolor=#fefefe
| 607950 ||  || — || September 30, 2006 || Mount Lemmon || Mount Lemmon Survey ||  || align=right data-sort-value="0.57" | 570 m || 
|-id=951 bgcolor=#fefefe
| 607951 ||  || — || September 14, 2002 || Palomar || NEAT ||  || align=right data-sort-value="0.86" | 860 m || 
|-id=952 bgcolor=#E9E9E9
| 607952 ||  || — || September 14, 2002 || Palomar || NEAT ||  || align=right | 2.5 km || 
|-id=953 bgcolor=#E9E9E9
| 607953 ||  || — || September 29, 2011 || Kitt Peak || Spacewatch || MAR || align=right | 1.2 km || 
|-id=954 bgcolor=#E9E9E9
| 607954 ||  || — || October 18, 2007 || Kitt Peak || Spacewatch ||  || align=right | 1.4 km || 
|-id=955 bgcolor=#fefefe
| 607955 ||  || — || February 4, 2011 || Catalina || CSS ||  || align=right data-sort-value="0.80" | 800 m || 
|-id=956 bgcolor=#E9E9E9
| 607956 ||  || — || November 4, 2007 || Kitt Peak || Spacewatch ||  || align=right | 1.7 km || 
|-id=957 bgcolor=#fefefe
| 607957 ||  || — || July 9, 2013 || Haleakala || Pan-STARRS ||  || align=right data-sort-value="0.72" | 720 m || 
|-id=958 bgcolor=#E9E9E9
| 607958 ||  || — || June 29, 2011 || Kitt Peak || Spacewatch ||  || align=right | 2.1 km || 
|-id=959 bgcolor=#E9E9E9
| 607959 ||  || — || October 10, 2007 || Kitt Peak || Spacewatch || WIT || align=right data-sort-value="0.90" | 900 m || 
|-id=960 bgcolor=#E9E9E9
| 607960 ||  || — || February 1, 2009 || Kitt Peak || Spacewatch ||  || align=right | 2.2 km || 
|-id=961 bgcolor=#E9E9E9
| 607961 ||  || — || December 22, 2003 || Kitt Peak || Spacewatch ||  || align=right | 2.1 km || 
|-id=962 bgcolor=#d6d6d6
| 607962 ||  || — || September 23, 2008 || Kitt Peak || Spacewatch ||  || align=right | 3.2 km || 
|-id=963 bgcolor=#fefefe
| 607963 ||  || — || September 30, 2006 || Mount Lemmon || Mount Lemmon Survey ||  || align=right data-sort-value="0.55" | 550 m || 
|-id=964 bgcolor=#fefefe
| 607964 ||  || — || August 14, 2013 || Haleakala || Pan-STARRS ||  || align=right data-sort-value="0.64" | 640 m || 
|-id=965 bgcolor=#E9E9E9
| 607965 ||  || — || November 8, 2007 || Mount Lemmon || Mount Lemmon Survey ||  || align=right | 1.9 km || 
|-id=966 bgcolor=#fefefe
| 607966 ||  || — || December 31, 2008 || Mount Lemmon || Mount Lemmon Survey || H || align=right data-sort-value="0.54" | 540 m || 
|-id=967 bgcolor=#E9E9E9
| 607967 ||  || — || August 27, 2011 || Haleakala || Pan-STARRS ||  || align=right | 1.6 km || 
|-id=968 bgcolor=#fefefe
| 607968 ||  || — || August 8, 2013 || Haleakala || Pan-STARRS ||  || align=right data-sort-value="0.58" | 580 m || 
|-id=969 bgcolor=#E9E9E9
| 607969 ||  || — || November 9, 2007 || Mount Lemmon || Mount Lemmon Survey ||  || align=right | 1.7 km || 
|-id=970 bgcolor=#fefefe
| 607970 ||  || — || October 20, 2017 || Mount Lemmon || Mount Lemmon Survey ||  || align=right data-sort-value="0.65" | 650 m || 
|-id=971 bgcolor=#fefefe
| 607971 ||  || — || October 23, 2006 || Mount Lemmon || Mount Lemmon Survey ||  || align=right data-sort-value="0.62" | 620 m || 
|-id=972 bgcolor=#E9E9E9
| 607972 ||  || — || October 12, 2007 || Mount Lemmon || Mount Lemmon Survey ||  || align=right | 1.7 km || 
|-id=973 bgcolor=#d6d6d6
| 607973 ||  || — || February 7, 2006 || Kitt Peak || Spacewatch ||  || align=right | 2.4 km || 
|-id=974 bgcolor=#fefefe
| 607974 ||  || — || September 27, 2002 || Palomar || NEAT || H || align=right data-sort-value="0.62" | 620 m || 
|-id=975 bgcolor=#fefefe
| 607975 ||  || — || September 27, 2002 || Palomar || NEAT ||  || align=right data-sort-value="0.90" | 900 m || 
|-id=976 bgcolor=#fefefe
| 607976 ||  || — || September 27, 2002 || Palomar || NEAT || NYS || align=right data-sort-value="0.61" | 610 m || 
|-id=977 bgcolor=#fefefe
| 607977 ||  || — || September 27, 2002 || Palomar || NEAT ||  || align=right data-sort-value="0.81" | 810 m || 
|-id=978 bgcolor=#fefefe
| 607978 ||  || — || September 29, 2002 || Haleakala || AMOS ||  || align=right | 1.1 km || 
|-id=979 bgcolor=#E9E9E9
| 607979 ||  || — || September 27, 2002 || Palomar || NEAT ||  || align=right | 2.2 km || 
|-id=980 bgcolor=#E9E9E9
| 607980 ||  || — || October 19, 2007 || Kitt Peak || Spacewatch ||  || align=right | 1.6 km || 
|-id=981 bgcolor=#E9E9E9
| 607981 ||  || — || September 19, 2011 || Catalina || CSS ||  || align=right | 2.4 km || 
|-id=982 bgcolor=#fefefe
| 607982 ||  || — || October 2, 2002 || Socorro || LINEAR || H || align=right data-sort-value="0.68" | 680 m || 
|-id=983 bgcolor=#E9E9E9
| 607983 ||  || — || October 3, 2002 || Campo Imperatore || CINEOS ||  || align=right | 2.2 km || 
|-id=984 bgcolor=#d6d6d6
| 607984 ||  || — || October 3, 2002 || Palomar || NEAT ||  || align=right | 4.4 km || 
|-id=985 bgcolor=#fefefe
| 607985 ||  || — || October 3, 2002 || Palomar || NEAT ||  || align=right data-sort-value="0.93" | 930 m || 
|-id=986 bgcolor=#fefefe
| 607986 ||  || — || October 3, 2002 || Socorro || LINEAR ||  || align=right data-sort-value="0.68" | 680 m || 
|-id=987 bgcolor=#E9E9E9
| 607987 ||  || — || October 3, 2002 || Socorro || LINEAR ||  || align=right | 1.6 km || 
|-id=988 bgcolor=#fefefe
| 607988 ||  || — || October 3, 2002 || Socorro || LINEAR ||  || align=right data-sort-value="0.86" | 860 m || 
|-id=989 bgcolor=#E9E9E9
| 607989 ||  || — || September 3, 2002 || Palomar || NEAT ||  || align=right | 1.7 km || 
|-id=990 bgcolor=#E9E9E9
| 607990 ||  || — || October 3, 2002 || Palomar || NEAT ||  || align=right | 2.1 km || 
|-id=991 bgcolor=#E9E9E9
| 607991 ||  || — || September 10, 2002 || Haleakala || AMOS ||  || align=right | 2.6 km || 
|-id=992 bgcolor=#E9E9E9
| 607992 ||  || — || October 4, 2002 || Palomar || NEAT ||  || align=right | 2.1 km || 
|-id=993 bgcolor=#E9E9E9
| 607993 ||  || — || October 4, 2002 || Palomar || NEAT ||  || align=right | 2.1 km || 
|-id=994 bgcolor=#fefefe
| 607994 ||  || — || October 5, 2002 || Palomar || NEAT ||  || align=right data-sort-value="0.80" | 800 m || 
|-id=995 bgcolor=#d6d6d6
| 607995 ||  || — || October 5, 2002 || Palomar || NEAT || HYG || align=right | 2.8 km || 
|-id=996 bgcolor=#E9E9E9
| 607996 ||  || — || October 5, 2002 || Palomar || NEAT ||  || align=right | 2.8 km || 
|-id=997 bgcolor=#E9E9E9
| 607997 ||  || — || September 30, 2002 || Haleakala || AMOS ||  || align=right | 2.3 km || 
|-id=998 bgcolor=#fefefe
| 607998 ||  || — || October 6, 2002 || Socorro || LINEAR || H || align=right data-sort-value="0.74" | 740 m || 
|-id=999 bgcolor=#E9E9E9
| 607999 ||  || — || October 9, 2002 || Socorro || LINEAR ||  || align=right | 3.2 km || 
|-id=000 bgcolor=#E9E9E9
| 608000 ||  || — || October 8, 2002 || Palomar || NEAT ||  || align=right | 2.1 km || 
|}

References

External links 
 Discovery Circumstances: Numbered Minor Planets (605001)–(610000) (IAU Minor Planet Center)

0607